This article lists compositions written for the viola.  The list includes works in which the viola is a featured instrument: viola solo, viola and piano, viola and orchestra, ensemble of violas, etc. Catalogue number, date of composition and publisher (for copyrighted works) are also included. Ordering is by composer surname.

This pages lists composers whose surname falls into the F to H alphabetic range.  For others, see respective pages:
 List of compositions for viola: A to B
 List of compositions for viola: C to E
 List of compositions for viola: I to K
 List of compositions for viola: L to N
 List of compositions for viola: O to R
 List of compositions for viola: S
 List of compositions for viola: T to Z

F
 Brendan Faegre (b. 1985)
     4 Koans for violin and viola (2011); Raven Feather Music
 Rolande Falcinelli (1920–2006)
     Canzon per sonar for 2 violas and organ, Op. 57 (1975)
     Récurrence for viola and piano, Op. 70 (1986); Collection Panorama: Œuvres Contemporaines, Volume 2 (1987); Éditions Gérard Billaudot
     Sine nomine for viola and piano, Op. 71 (1987); Symétrie
     Tétrade for viola and organ, Op. 60 (1976)
 David Fanshawe (1942–2010)
     The Awakening, Intermezzo for cello or viola and piano (1981); Oxford University Press
 Harry Farjeon (1878–1948)
     2 Morceaux (2 Pieces) for viola and piano (1911)
 Ferenc Farkas (1905–2000)
     Ahogy tetszik (As You Like It), Suite in Old Style for violin, viola and harp (1939, revised 1969); based on the incidental music for the play by William Shakespeare
     All'antica for viola and harpsichord or piano (1962); original for baryton and harpsichord; Editio Musica Budapest
     Arioso for viola and piano (1926); Zeneműkiadó Vállalat; Editio Musica Budapest
     Bihari román táncok (Rumanian Folk Dances from Bihar) for viola and piano (1950); Editio Musica Budapest
     Eclogue for viola and guitar
     Három táncparafrázis (Three Dance Paraphrases) for flute, viola and horn (1972); Editio Musica Budapest
     Meditazione for flute, viola and piano (1990); Ascolta
     Sonata a due for viola and cello (1961); Zeneműkiadó Vállalat; Editio Musica Budapest
     Tiz tanulmány (Ten Studies) for violin and viola (1997); Editio Musica Budapest
 Gareth Farr (b. 1968)
     Meditation for viola and piano (1996); Promethean Editions
     The Seventh Age for viola, sheng and Balinese gamelan (2009)
 Eibhlis Farrell (b. 1953)
     Elegy for viola and piano (1977); Ireland Contemporary Music Centre
     Penelope Weaving for viola solo (1994); Ireland Contemporary Music Centre
 Bruce Faulconer (b. 1951)
     Fantasia for viola solo (1980)
     Fantasia No. 2 for viola solo (1990)
 Hélène-Frédérique de Faye-Jozin (1871–1942)
     Concertstück for viola and piano (1932); Éditions Louis Rouhier
 Alfio Fazio (b. 1959)
     In limine for viola solo (1992)
 Ivan Fedele (b. 1953)
     Concerto for viola and orchestra (1990, revised 1995); Edizioni Suvini Zerboni
     Elettra for viola and live electronics (1999); Edizioni Suvini Zerboni
     L'Orizzonte di Elettra for viola, chamber orchestra and live electronics (1997); Edizioni Suvini Zerboni
     Paroles..., 2 Pezzi (2 Pieces) for female voice and viola (2000); Edizioni Suvini Zerboni
     Ritrovari, Suite francese VI for viola solo (2011); Edizioni Suvini Zerboni
 Jindřich Feld (1925–2007)
     Concerto for viola and orchestra (2003–2004); Český Hudební Fond
     Duo for violin and cello (or viola) (1989); Český Hudební Fond
     Koncertantní hudba (Concertante Music) for viola and piano (1983); Editio Bärenreiter Praha
     Malá sonatina (Little Sonatina) for viola and piano (1974); Editio Bärenreiter Praha
     Musique concertante for flute, viola, harp and string orchestra (2005); Český Hudební Fond
     Sonata for viola and piano (1955); Editio Bärenreiter Praha
 Morton Feldman (1926–1987)
     Rothko Chapel for viola, percussion, celesta, soprano, alto and chorus (1971); written for performance at Rothko Chapel; Universal Edition
     The Viola in My Life I for viola, flute, violin, cello, piano and percussion (1970); Universal Edition
     The Viola in My Life II for viola, flute, clarinet, violin, cello, celesta and percussion (1970); Universal Edition
     The Viola in My Life III for viola and piano (1970); Universal Edition
     The Viola in My Life IV for viola and orchestra (1971); Universal Edition
 Daniel Felsenfeld (b. 1970)
     Hooked to the Silver Screen for viola solo (2011)
 Philippe Fénelon (b. 1952)
     Caprice for viola solo (1977, revised 1982); Éditions Amphion; United Music Publishers
     Epha for bassoon and viola (2000)
     Fragment II for basset horn and viola (2002)
     Nit for viola solo (1994); Éditions Amphion; United Music Publishers
 Vladimir Fere (1902–1971)
     Sonata for flute and viola
     Sonata for viola and piano, Op. 10 (1927)
     Suite (Сюита) for viola solo, Op. 9 (1927)
 Howard Ferguson (1908–1999)
     Five Irish Folk Tunes for viola or cello and piano (1927, revised 1988); Oxford University Press
     Four Short Pieces for viola and piano, Op. 6 (1932–1936); Boosey & Hawkes
 Armando José Fernandes (1906–1983)
     Sonatina for viola and piano (1945); AvA Musical Editions
 Gabriel Fernández Álvez (1943–2008)
     Oda (Ode) for viola and piano (1984)
 Brian Ferneyhough (b. 1943)
     Incipits for viola, obbligato percussion and six instruments (1996); Edition Peters
 John Fernström (1897–1961)
     Concerto for viola and orchestra, Op. 34 (1937); STIM; Swedish Music Information Centre
     Romans ciss-moll (Romance in C Minor) for viola and orchestra; STIM; Swedish Music Information Centre
 Andrea Ferrante (b. 1968)
     Filtrò poi una luce for viola and piano (2010)
     Il fiore d'inverno for viola and harp (2010)
     Il petalo blu for flute, viola and harp (2010)
     L'orizzonte e oltre for viola and string orchestra (2011)
 Giorgio Ferrari (1925–2010)
     Divertimento for viola d'amore and viola
     Improvvisazione for viola solo (1979); Boccaccini & Spada Editions
     Memorie for viola and orchestra (1975); Casa Musicale Sonzogno
     Sonata for viola and piano (1973); G. Zanibon
 Luc Ferrari (1929–2005)
     Didascalies for viola, piano and memorized mound on media (2004); Brunhild Ferrari
     Rencontres Fortuites for viola, piano and memorized mound on media (2003); Brunhild Ferrari
 Lorenzo Ferrero (b. 1951)
     Sonata for viola and piano (2000)
 Claude Ferrier (b. 1963)
     Cinq-chronique for flute, viola and harp (1994–1995)
 John Ferritto (1937–2010)
     Abstractions, Duo for viola and piano, Op. 39 (2001); American Composers Alliance
     Canzone for viola solo, Op. 8 (1968); American Composers Alliance
     Duo Toccata for viola and cello, Op. 24 (1990); American Composers Alliance
     Fantasy Duo for viola and piano, Op. 20 (1984); American Composers Alliance
     Movement for viola and percussion orchestra, Op. 22 (1989); American Composers Alliance
     Quattro Diversioni for clarinet, viola and piano, Op. 3 (1966); American Composers Alliance
     Sogni for soprano, viola (offstage) and orchestra, Op. 12 (1972); American Composers Alliance
     Violette for 2 violas, Op. 40 (2001); American Composers Alliance
     Violin and Viola Duo, Op. 35 (2000); American Composers Alliance
 Josef Fiala (1748–1816)
     Adagio and 10 Variations for oboe and viola; Doblinger
 Jacobo Ficher (1896–1978)
     Sonata for flute, viola and piano, Op. 18 (1931)
     Sonata for viola and piano, Op. 80 (1953); Editorial Argentina de Musica
     Tres piezas (3 Pieces) for viola and piano, Op. 76 (1953)
 Juraj Filas (1955–2021)
     Sonata No. 1 for viola and piano (1978); Schott Music Panton
     Sonata No. 2 "In memoriam" for viola and piano (1988); Český Hudební Fond; Editions Bim
     Sonata for viola and organ (1979); Český Hudební Fond
 Anton Fils (Filtz) (1733–1760)
     Concerto in D major for viola and orchestra
 Elaine Fine (b. 1959)
     Canzona for viola and harp (2002); Seesaw Music
     Crepuscule, Interlude and Dance for flute, violin and viola (2006); Seesaw Music
     Evening Music for 2 violins and viola (2002); Seesaw Music
     Germaine for oboe, viola and harp (2001)
     The Happy Family for narrator, viola, bass clarinet and piano (2005); after the story by Hans Christian Andersen; Seesaw Music
     Luxury Suite for viola (or cello) and piano (2005); Seesaw Music
     New Year's Greeting for 2 violas (2012)
     Partly Sunny for violin and viola (2005)
     Skye Boat Fantasie for violin, viola and piano (2009)
     Sonata for viola and piano (2003); Seesaw Music
     Tango Mariposa for viola and piano (2002); Seesaw Music
     Trio for violin, viola and piano (2012)
     Two Pieces for viola and piano (2008)
     The Ugly Duckling for bass clarinet, viola and string orchestra (2005); after the story by Hans Christian Andersen; Seesaw Music
     Under the Apricot Tree for countertenor (or mezzo-soprano), bass flute, and viola (2001); Seesaw Music
 Vivian Fine (1913–2000)
     Duo for flute and viola (1961); C. Fischer
     Lieder for viola and piano (1979); Sisra Publications; Arsis Press
     The Song of Persephone for solo viola (1964); Catamount Facsimile Edition
 Fidelio Finke (1891–1968)
     8 Musiken for 2 violins and viola (1923); Verlag Neue Musik
     Sonata for viola and piano (1954); Breitkopf & Härtel
 Ross Lee Finney (1906–1997)
     Sonata [No. 1] in A minor for viola and piano (1937, revised 1950); C.F. Peters
     Sonata No. 2 for viola and piano (1953, revised 1955); C.F. Peters
 Michael Finnissy (b. 1946)
     Obrecht Motetten III for solo viola or solo viola with chamber ensemble (1989); Oxford University Press
     Untitled Piece in Memory of Igor Stravinsky for flute, viola and harp (1971); also for flute solo; Tre Media Musikverlage
 Graciane Finzi (b. 1945)
     Ainsi la Vie for viola solo (1991); Éditions Durand; United Music Publishers
     Concerto for viola and orchestra
     Impression Tango for viola and piano (or accordion) (2005); Éditions Gérard Billaudot; United Music Publishers
     Les chiens qui rêvent dans la nuit (The Dogs That Dream in the Night), Trio for flute, viola and harp (1982)
     Osmose for viola and guitar (2001); Éditions Hapax
 Ertuğrul Oğuz Fırat (1923–2014)
     Bağımsız Çığırgılar Ardışı (Les Chansons Independant-Suite), Trio No. 5 for clarinet, viola and piano, Op. 75 (1963, 1985); adapted from Bağımsız Şarkılar (Independent Songs), Op. 18 (1963)
     Concerto No. 1 Kaynak Sonunu Bekliyordu for viola and orchestra, Op. 28 (1967, revised 1975)
     Concerto No. 2 Kanıtsız Günlerin Oldusu (A Vision of Days Past) for viola and orchestra, Op. 35 (1968); Seesaw Music
     Küçük Parçalar (Short Pieces) for viola and piano, Op. 12 (1956–1958)
     Sonatçık (Petite Sonata) for viola and piano, Op. 11 (1957–1958)
 Elena Firsova (b. 1950)
     Meditation in the Japanese Garden for flute, viola and piano, Op. 54 (1992); Meladina Press
     Suite for viola solo, Op. 2 (1967); Meladina Press; Hans Sikorski
 Nenad Firšt (b. 1964)
     Love Song for 2 violas (1988); Društvo Slovenskih Skladateljev
     SSSSS, Variations for viola and double bass (1991); Društvo Slovenskih Skladateljev
     Tres Faciunt Collegium for clarinet, viola and piano (2001); Društvo Slovenskih Skladateljev
 Georgy Firtich (1938–2016)
     Sonata-Fantasy (Соната-Фантазия) in A minor for viola and piano (1986); Sovetsky Kompozitor; Kompozitor
 Luboš Fišer (1935–1999)
     Sonata for solo viola and string quartet (1991); Český Hudební Fond
     Zapomenuté písně (Forgotten Songs) for mezzo-soprano, alto flute, viola and piano (1985); Český Hudební Fond
 Adrian Vernon Fish (b. 1956)
     Elegy for viola solo (1984)
     Polly's Moods: Epigrams for a Mime for viola solo (1992)
     Sonata "Qaanaaq" for viola and piano (2000)
     Uyeasound Nocturne for viola and piano (1989)
 Jerzy Fitelberg (1903–1951)
     Serenada for viola and piano (1943); Southern Music
 William Flackton (1709–1798)
     Sonata in C major for viola and harpsichord, Op. 2 No. 4
     Sonata in D major for viola and harpsichord, Op. 2 No. 5
     Sonata in G major for viola and harpsichord, Op. 2 No. 6
     Sonata in C minor for viola and harpsichord, Op. 2 No. 8
 Robert Fleming (1921–1976)
     Berceuse for violin, or viola, or cello and piano (1962); Canadian Music Centre
 Hélène Fleury-Roy (1876–1957)
     Fantaisie in E minor for viola (or violin) and piano, Op. 18 (1906)
 Marius Flothuis (1914–2001)
     Elegia for viola solo, Op. 81 No. 2 (1981); No. 2 from Frivolités, Drie stukken voor strijkinstrumenten (Frivolités, 3 
 George Flynn (b. 1937)
     Duo for viola and piano (1974, 1985, 1995); Imprimis Music
 John Fodi (1944–2009)
     Against Black Woods, Long Streaks of Rain for viola solo, Op. 88 (1998); Canadian Music Centre
     Badineries, 3 Pieces for viola and piano, Op. 99 No. 1 (2008); Canadian Music Centre
     Concerto for viola and 2 wind ensembles, Op. 35 (1972); Canadian Music Centre
     Divisions III for viola solo, Op. 34 (1971); Canadian Music Centre
     Iz Ist in Der Werlt Wol Schin for high voice and viola (1975); Canadian Music Centre
     Trio for flute, viola and harpsichord (1977); Canadian Music Centre
     Variations III for viola and percussion, Op. 52 (1978); Canadian Music Centre
 Carel Anton Fodor (1768–1846)
     Thème et sept variations (Theme and 7 Variations) for viola with violin accompaniment
 Josef Bohuslav Foerster (1859–1951)
     Dvě písně s violou a klavírem (2 Songs with Viola and Piano), Op. 91 (1912); Hudební matice Umělecké besedy
     Zbirožská Suita (Zbiroh Suite) for viola and piano, Op. 167 (1940); Hudební matice Umělecké besedy
 Eloy Fominaya (1925–2002)
     Concerto for viola and orchestra (1963)
 Bjørn Fongaard (1919–1980)
     Concerto for viola and orchestra, Op. 119 No. 8 (1977); Music Information Centre Norway
     Concerto for viola and tape, Op. 131 No. 18 (1976); Music Information Centre Norway
     Duo for viola and cello, Op. 127 No. 16 (1974); Music Information Centre Norway
     Duo for violin and viola, Op. 127 No. 12 (1974); Music Information Centre Norway
     Sonata No. 1 for viola solo, Op. 125 No. 43 (1973); Music Information Centre Norway
     Sonata No. 2 for viola solo, Op. 125 No. 44 (1973); Music Information Centre Norway
     Sonata No. 3 for viola solo, Op. 125 No. 45 (1973); Music Information Centre Norway
     Sonatina for viola and piano, Op. 126 No. 28 (1974); Music Information Centre Norway
     Trio for flute, viola and harp (1971); Music Information Centre Norway
 Jacqueline Fontyn (b. 1930)
     Fougères (Ferns) for viola and harp or piano (1981); CeBeDeM
 Arthur Foote (1853–1937)
     Sarabande and Rigaudon for oboe, viola and piano
 Sebastian Forbes (b. 1941)
     Crete Songs for baritone (or mezzo-soprano), viola and piano (1966); International Music Company
     St Andrews Solo for viola solo (2009)
     Viola Fantasy for viola solo (1979); British Music Information Centre
 Andrew Ford (b. 1957)
     Chorales from an Ox Life for viola and double bass (2007); Australian Music Centre
     The Very End of Harvest for viola and piano (2000); Australian Music Centre
     Swansong for viola solo (1987); Australian Music Centre
     The Unquiet Grave for solo viola and chamber orchestra (1997–1998); Australian Music Centre
     You Must Sleep, but I Must Dance for viola and percussion (2010)
 Cecil Forsyth (1870–1941)
     Chanson celtique in D minor for viola and piano or orchestra (1905); Edition Schott
     Concerto in G minor for viola and orchestra (1903); Edition Schott
     The Dark Road for viola and string orchestra (1922); H. W. Gray; American Viola Society Publications
 Malcolm Forsyth (1936–2011)
     The Dong with a Luminous Nose for mezzo-soprano, viola and piano (1979); Counterpoint Music Library Services; Canadian Music Centre
     Double Concerto for viola, cello and orchestra (2004); Counterpoint Music Library Services
     Intimacies for flute, viola and guitar (1977) or for flute, viola and harp (2000); Counterpoint Music Library Services; Canadian Music Centre
     In Perfect Harmony for viola, cello and piano (2004); Counterpoint Music Library Services
     Steps for viola and piano (1978); Counterpoint Music Library Services; Canadian Music Centre
 Wolfgang Fortner (1907–1987)
     Aria for viola solo
     Concertino in G minor for viola and chamber orchestra (1934); Edition Schott; Associated Music Publishers
     Solostück for viola solo (1979)
 Lukas Foss (1922–2009)
     Orpheus for viola (or cello, or violin) and chamber orchestra (1973); Éditions Salabert
 Kalitha Dorothy Fox (1894–1934)
     Sonata in C minor for viola and piano, Op. 7 (c.1925); Éditions Maurice Senart
 Jean Françaix (1912–1997)
     Divertissement for violin, viola and cello soli with orchestra (1935) or with piano (1974); Schott Music
     Rhapsodie for viola and piano (1946, 1993); also for viola and small orchestra (1946); Edition Schott
     Trio for clarinet, viola and piano (1990); Edition Schott
 Luca Francesconi (b. 1956)
     Animus II for viola and electronics (2007)
     Charlie Chan for viola solo (1991)
     Piccola trama for saxophone (or viola) and 8 instruments (1989)
 Maurice Franck (1897–1983)
     Suite for viola and orchestra (1965); Éditions Musicales Transatlantiques
     Thème et variations for viola and orchestra (1957); Éditions Durand
 Gabriela Lena Frank (b. 1972)
     Cinco Danzas de Chambi for viola and piano (2006); G. Schirmer
     La Llorona, Tone Poem for viola and orchestra (2007); G. Schirmer
 Benjamin Frankel (1906–1973)
     Sonata for viola solo, Op. 7 (early 1930s)
     Concerto for viola and orchestra, Op. 45 (1967); Novello & Co.
 Wim Franken (1922–2012)
     Sonata for viola solo (1948); Donemus
 Isadore Freed (1900–1960)
     Rhapsody for viola and orchestra (1945); Carl Fischer
     Shepherd's Holiday for voice, viola and piano
     Suite for viola and piano
     Trio for flute, viola and harp (1940); Transcontinental Music Publications
 Jan Freidlin (b. 1944)
     Music of the Passing Summer for flute, viola and harp (1996)
     Night Seine Blues for viola and piano; Musik Fabrik
     Tenderness for viola and harp (or guitar, or piano); Musik Fabrik
 Don Freund (b. 1947)
     Concerto (in One Movement) for viola and orchestra (1995); MMB Music
     Crossings for viola and guitar (1976); MMB Music
     Fanfare for Violas for 8 to 24 violas (1995)
     SeeNoHearNoSpeakNo for 3 dancers, viola, double bass and percussion (pots and pans) (2011)
     Seven Etudes à Due for viola and cello (1973); Seesaw Music
     Songs Without Words, 3 Pieces for viola and piano (2011)
     Three Bagatelles for viola and piano (1968)
 Emil Frey (1889–1946)
     3 Pièces for viola and piano, Op. 79 (1936)
 Jürg Frey (b. 1953)
     Mit Schweigen wird's gesprochen II for viola solo (1993, 1995); Timescraper Music
     (Unbetitelt) IV (Untitled IV) for viola and piano (1990); Timescraper Music
     Viola, Klavier (Viola, Piano) for viola and piano (1997); Timescraper Music
     Wen 21 for viola solo (2000); Timescraper Music
     Wen 29 for viola solo (2003); Timescraper Music
 Peter Fribbins (b. 1969)
     2 Fantasias for viola and piano (2007–2011) 
 Peter Racine Fricker (1920–1990)
     Concerto for viola and orchestra, Op. 18 (Op. 20) (1952); Schott Music
     Fantasy for viola and piano, Op. 44 (1966); American Viola Society Publications
     Three Movements for viola solo, Op. 25 (1955)
 Géza Frid (1904–1989)
     Concerto for viola, string orchestra and bass drum, Op. 108 (1985); Donemus
     Sonatina for viola and piano, Op. 25 (1946); Donemus
     Vice Versa II for viola and piano, Op. 96 (1982); Donemus
 Grigory Frid (1915–2012)
     Concerto for viola and chamber orchestra, Op. 52 (1967); Hans Sikorski
     Concerto for viola, piano and string orchestra, Op. 73 (1981); Sovetsky Kompozitor; Schirmer Russian Music; Hans Sikorski
     Phèdre (Федра; Phaedra) for viola solo, 2 violins, cello and piano, Op. 78 No. 1 (1985); version for viola and piano entitled Viola Sonata No. 2; Sovetsky Kompozitor; Hans Sikorski
     6 Pieces (Шесть пьес; 6 Stücke) for viola and piano, Op. 68 (1975); Hans Sikorski
     Sonata [No. 1] for viola and piano, Op. 62 No. 1 (1971); Sovetsky Kompozitor; Hans Sikorski
     Sonata No. 2 for viola and piano, Op. 78 No. 2 (1985); second version of Phèdre; Sovetsky Kompozitor; Hans Sikorski
 Gary William Friedman
     Colloquy for viola and piano (2007)
 Witold Friemann (1889–1977)
     Concerto No. 1 for viola and orchestra, Op. 175 (1952)
     Concerto No. 2 in Three Parts (Koncert nr. 2 w trzech częściach) for solo viola, string orchestra, timpani and cymbals, Op. 303 (1968)
     Cztery pieśni rycerskie (4 Chivalrous Songs), Suite for viola and harp (or piano) (1935)
     Cztery pieśni rycerskie (4 Chivalrous Songs), Concertino for viola and harp with flute, oboe, clarinet, 2 bassoons, contra-bassoon and percussion (1970)
     Myśli (Thoughts) for viola and piano (1971)
     Mazurek in G minor for viola and piano (1975)
     Sonata for viola and piano (1935)
     Trzy utwory (3 Pieces) for viola and piano (1940–1947)
 James Friskin (1886–1967)
     Elegy for viola and piano (1912); Stainer & Bell
 Johannes Fritsch (1941–2010)
     Duett für Bratsche for viola and tape (1961)
     Partita for viola, contact microphones, magnetophones, filters, regulators (4 players) (1965–1966); Edition Modern
     Trio for viola, trombone and piano with ring modulator (1977)
     Viola Duo for 2 violas (1983, 2004); original version for 2 cellos
     X '88 for viola, cello and double bass (1988)
 David Froom (b. 1951)
     Elegy for viola solo (2006)
     Songs of a Summer Evening for violin, viola and orchestra (2004)
 Ivar Frounberg (b. 1950)
     "D" for violin and viola (1986); Edition Samfundet
     Epitome for viola solo (1999); Edition SUDM (Samfundet til Udgivelse af Dansk Musik)
 Gunnar de Frumerie (1908–1987)
     Divertimento for clarinet (or viola) and cello, Op. 63 (1966); STIM; Swedish Music Information Centre
     Duo for oboe and viola (1928); Swedish Music Information Centre
     Tio variationer över en svensk folkvisa (Ten Variations on a Swedish Folk Song) for viola and guitar, Op. 69b (1977); STIM; Swedish Music Information Centre
 Kenneth Fuchs (b. 1956)
     Divinum Mysterium, Concerto for viola and orchestra (2008); Edward B. Marks Music Company
 Lillian Fuchs (1901–1995)
     12 Caprices for viola solo (1950); G. Schirmer
     15 Characteristic Studies for viola solo (1956); Oxford University Press
     16 Fantasy Etudes for viola solo (1959); International Music Company
     Sonata Pastorale for viola solo (1953); Associated Music Publishers
 Robert Fuchs (1847–1927)
     12 Duets for violin and viola, Op. 60 (1898)
     6 Phantasiestücke (6 Fantasy Pieces) for viola and piano, Op. 117 (published 1927)
     7 Phantasiestücke (7 Fantasy Pieces) for violin, viola and piano, Op. 57 (1897)
     Sonata in D minor for viola and piano, Op. 86 (1909)
     Terzett for 2 violins and viola, Op. 107 (1923)
     2 Terzetti for 2 violins and viola, Op. 61 (1898)
     Trio in F minor for violin, viola and piano, Op. 115 (1920)
 Dai Fujikura (b. 1977)
     Breathless for viola and toy piano (2004); G. Ricordi London
     Cutting Sky for viola and koto (2006); G. Ricordi London
     Dolphins (ドルフィンズ) for 2 violas (2010); Tokyo Ricordi
     flux for viola solo (2007); G. Ricordi London
     Prism Spectra (プリズム・スペクトラ) for viola and electronics (2009); Paris Ricordi
     Still Sweet for mezzo-soprano, viola and alto flute (1998); G. Ricordi London
     Still Sweet II for mezzo-soprano, viola and alto flute (1998, revised 2008); G. Ricordi London
     Touch of Breeze for viola, clarinet and shō (2004); G. Ricordi London
 Anis Fuleihan (1900–1970)
     Concerto for viola and orchestra (1963)
     Duo for viola and cello (1971); Southern Music Publishing
     Fantasy for viola and orchestra (1938)
     Recitative and Sicilienne for cello (or viola) and piano (1945); Southern Music Publishing; G. Schirmer
     Sonata for viola and piano
     Symphonie Concertante for string quartet and orchestra (1939)
 James Fulkerson (b. 1945)
     Chamber Musics VII for viola and tape (1976)
     Patterns V for bass flute or viola solo (1975); Edition Modern
 Norman Fulton (1909–1980)
     Introduction, Air and Reel for viola and piano, Op. 11 (1950); Oxford University Press
     Sonata de Camera for viola and piano, Op. 9 (1945); Chester Music
 Raphaël Fumet (1898–1979)
     Diptyque baroque for flute and viola (1958?); Editions Delatour
     3 Pièces for viola and piano; Editions Delatour
          Lacrimosa in F major
          Barcarolle in E major
          Andante pathétique
 Arthur Furer (1924–2013)
     E chlyni Husmusig (Eine kleine Hausmusik) for violin and viola (or 2 violins) (1998); Müller & Schade
     Kleine geistliche Kantate (Little Sacred Cantata) for high voice, viola obbligato and organ; Müller & Schade
     Musica for viola solo (1991); Müller & Schade
 Beat Furrer (b. 1954)
     a due for viola and piano (1997); Bärenreiter Verlag
 Franz Furrer-Münch (1924–2010)
     Colla voce, Concerto for viola and chamber orchestra (2007–2008); Tre Media Musikverlage
     Freundliche Landschaft for viola solo (2003); Tre Media Musikverlage
     Instants modifiés for viola, cello and double bass (1989); Tre Media Musikverlage
 Paul Walter Fürst (1926–2013)
     Bratschen-Trio for 3 violas, Op. 67 (1982); Verlag Doblinger
     Concerto for 2 violas and 16 woodwinds, Op. 23 (1956); Verlag Doblinger
     Concerto for viola, cello and orchestra, Op. 58 (1976); Verlag Doblinger
     Duo for viola and cello, Op. 17 (1953); Verlag Doblinger
     Egoton, Trio for viola, cello and double bass, Op. 68 (1982); Verlag Doblinger
     Emotionen, 7 Duos for viola and double bass, Op. 57 (1976); for Viola, Double Bass and String Orchestra, Op. 57a (1980); Verlag Doblinger
     Kaiserwalzer, Arrangement of Emperor Waltzes by Johann Strauss II for 12 violas, Op. 63 (1980)
     Omedeto for 12 violas, Op. 54 (1974); Verlag Doblinger
     Petitionen, Trio for clarinet, viola and piano, Op. 51 (1972); Verlag Doblinger
     Sonata for viola and piano, Op. 33 (1962); Verlag Doblinger
     Sonatina for viola and piano, Op. 13 (1952); Verlag Doblinger
     Togata, Four Scenes for 2 violas, Op. 45 (1968); Verlag Doblinger
     Unter Donner und Blitz, arrangement of Thunder and Lightning Polka by Johann Strauss II for 12 violas, Op. 63a (1981)
     Violatüre for viola and percussion, Op. 69 (1983); Verlag Doblinger
 Anton Bernhard Fürstenau (1792–1852)
     Serenade for flute, viola and guitar, Op. 10 (c.1822)
     Les Charmes de Maxen, Serenade for flute, viola and guitar, Op. 86 (1831)

G
 Morten Gaathaug (b. 1955)
     5 Duets for violin and viola, Op. 2b (1978); Music Information Centre Norway
     Norwegian Fantasy for clarinet, viola and piano, Op. 44b (1994); Music Information Centre Norway
     Quasi una fantasia for viola and piano, Op. 12d (1980, 2002); Music Information Centre Norway
 Kenneth Gaburo (1926–1993)
     Ideas and Transformations No. 1 for violin and viola (1954–1955); Theodore Presser Company
     Ideas and Transformations No. 3 for viola and cello (1955)
 Niels Gade (1817–1890)
     3 Fantasistykker (3 Fantasy Pieces) for clarinet or viola and piano, Op. 43 (1864)
     Sonata in A major for viola and piano, Op. 6 (1842); adaptation of the Sonata No. 1 for violin and piano by Heinrich Dessauer
 Renaud Gagneux (1947–2018)
     Concerto for viola and orchestra, Op. 51 (1997); Éditions Durand
     Duo for violin and viola (1973); Éditions Durand
 Alain Gagnon (1938–2017)
     Altitude maximale (Maximum Altitude) for viola and piano, Op. 44 (1999); Doberman-Yppan; Canadian Music Centre
 Wenzel Gährich (1794–1864)
     Concertino in G minor for viola and orchestra, Op. 2 (1831)
 Varvara Gaigerova (1903–1944)
     Suite in D minor for viola and piano, Op. 8 (published 1969); Sovietsky Kompozitor
 Hans Gál (1890–1987)
     Divertimento for violin and viola, Op. 90 No. 3 (1969); N. Simrock, London; Boosey & Hawkes
     Impromptu for viola and piano (1940); Edition Schott
     Sonata in A major for viola and piano, Op. 101 (1941); N. Simrock, London; Boosey & Hawkes
     Suite for viola and orchestra, Op. 102a (1949–1950); N. Simrock, London; Boosey & Hawkes
 Baldassare Galuppi (1706–1785)
     Aria Amorosa for viola and piano; transcription by Lionel Tertis (1954); Augener
 Grigori Gamburg (1900–1967)
     2 Tunes from the "Song of Songs" (2 Pieces; Два напева из «Песни Песней»; Zwei Fragmente "Aus dem Hohen Lied") for viola and piano, Op. 5 (1928);  (State Music Publishing House); Universal Edition
     Concerto for viola and orchestra (1943); Sovetsky Kompozitor
 Gerardo Gandini (1936–2013)
     Concerto for viola and orchestra (1979)
     Honeyrom for viola and piano (1973)
     Oneiron for viola and piano (1978)
     Trioneiron for clarinet, viola and piano (1978, 1980); Editorial Argentina de Compositores
 Antón García Abril (1933–2021)
     Cantos de Ordesa (Songs of Ordesa), Concerto for viola and orchestra (2012); Bolamar Ediciones Musicales
 Orlando Jacinto García (b. 1954)
     Como los colores del viento nocturno for viola and tape (with wind chimes) (2002)
     Entre el anochecer y la oscuridad for viola and orchestra (1992)
     Fragmentos congelados for viola and piano (1991); Kallisti Music Press
     Variations on Metallic and Wooden Shades for viola and percussion (1988)
     Viento nocturno for viola solo (with small percussion) (2002)
 Jules Garcin (1830–1896)
     Concertino in D major for viola (or cello) and orchestra, Op. 19 (1870)
 Samuel Gardner (1891–1984)
     From the Canebrake for viola and piano, Op. 5 No. 1 (1918); original for violin and piano; G. Schirmer
 Zoltán Gárdonyi (1906–1986)
     Sonata No. 2 for viola and piano (1950); Edition Walhall, Magdeburg
 Michael Garrett (b. 1944)
     3 Pieces for viola and piano, Op. 70 (1989); Scottish Music Centre
     Suite for viola and piano, Op. 34 (1985); Scottish Music Centre
 Odette Gartenlaub (1922–2014)
     Étude concertante for viola solo (1984); Éditions Gérard Billaudot; United Music Publishers
 Ulrich Gasser (b. 1950)
     Bel Air for viola and piano (2005)
     4 kleine Stücke (4 Little Pieces) for viola solo (1978)
     Sie verstanden seine Worte nicht, Station II from Kleine Passion am Stadtberg for viola and organ (2006)
     Steinstücke (Stone Pieces) for viola, piano, piano-string player and assistant (ad libitum) (1978)
     Und bräche nicht aus allen seinen Rändern aus wie ein Stern for viola and piano (1981–1984)
 Crawford Gates (1921–2018)
     Ballade for viola and piano, Op. 71 (1991); Pacific Publications
 Heinrich Gattermeyer (1923–2018)
     Divertimento for clarinet, viola and piano, Op. 114 (1973); Verlag Doblinger
     Duo for viola and double bass (1979); Verlag Doblinger
     Kassation I for flute, viola and guitar (1974); Verlag Doblinger
     Sechs Grotesken (6 Grotesques) for viola and piano, Op. 108 No. 1 (1971); Verlag Doblinger
 Luigi Gatti (1740–1817)
     7 Sonatas for violin and viola (c.1783)
     Sonata for flute and viola
 Philippe Gaubert (1879–1941)
     Ballade in A major for viola and piano (1938); Éditions Max Eschig
 Éric Gaudibert (1936–2012)
     A... in Wonderland for viola and ensemble (2007); Édition Musicale Suisse
     Au delà (Beyond) for flute, viola and cello (2005); Édition Musicale Suisse
     Chant de l'aube (Song of the Dawn) for viola solo (1993–1995); Édition Musicale Suisse
     Le dit d'elle (Says Her) for viola solo (1995, 2007); original for double bass solo; Édition Musicale Suisse
     Message for cello solo and viola (2000); Éditions Papillon
 Robert Gauldin (b. 1931)
     Sonata serioso for viola and piano (1962); Tritone Press
 Michel-Joseph Gebauer (1763 or 1765–1812)
     6 Duos for violin and viola (1782)
     6 Duos for violin and viola, Op. 5 (between 1787 and 1794)
 John Maxwell Geddes (1941–2017)
     Apt for viola solo (1976); Periwinkle Publications; Scottish Music Publishing
     Voilà! for 12 violas (1981); Periwinkle Publications; Scottish Music Publishing
 Christian Geisler (1869–1951)
     Sonata in D minor for viola and piano, Op. 10 (1920); Skandinavisk musikforlag
 Fritz Geißler (1921–1984)
     Sonata for viola solo (1953); Friedrich Hofmeister Verlag
     Sonata for viola and piano (1969); Edition Peters
     Sonatina for viola and piano (1954); Breitkopf & Härtel
     Trio for flute, viola and harp (1979)
 Steven Gellman (b. 1947)
     The Bride's Reception, Symphonic Contemplation for English horn and viola soli with orchestra (1983); Canadian Music Centre
     Concerto for viola and orchestra (2004); Canadian Music Centre
 Jiří Gemrot (b. 1957)
     Invence (Inventions), 6 Duets for violin and viola (1984); Český Hudební Fond
     Sonata No. 2 for viola and piano (1979); Český Hudební Fond
     Preludia (Preludes) for viola and piano (1986)
     Meditace (Meditation) for viola and organ (1986); Český Hudební Fond
 Vladimir Genin (b. 1958)
     Poème (Поэма) for viola and piano (1986)
     Sonata for viola and piano (1985); Sovetsky Kompozitor
 Ada Gentile (b. 1947)
     Around for flute, clarinet and viola (1984); Ricordi
     Criptografia for viola and chamber orchestra (1985); Ricordi
     Insight for 2 violins and viola (1984); Ricordi
     Perviolasola for viola solo (1987); Ricordi
 Harald Genzmer (1909–2007)
     Concerto for viola and orchestra (1967); Henry Litolff's Verlag; C.F. Peters
     Duettino for flute and viola (1983); Henry Litolff's Verlag; C.F. Peters
     Duo for violin and viola (1996); Ries & Erler Musikverlag
     Kammerkonzert (Chamber Concerto) for viola and string orchestra (1972)
     Notturno for viola and string orchestra (1970); original for horn and strings; Henry Litolff's Verlag; C.F. Peters
     Sonata for viola solo (1957); Henry Litolff's Verlag; C.F. Peters
     Sonata No. 1 in D major for viola and piano (1940); Ries & Erler Musikverlag
     Sonata No. 2 for viola and piano (1955); Edition Schott
     Sonatina for viola and piano (1971); Henry Litolff's Verlag; C.F. Peters
     Trio for flute, viola and harp (1947); Henry Litolff's Verlag; C.F. Peters
 René Gerber (1908–2006)
     Concertino for flute, viola and piano (1936); Pizzicato Verlag Helvetia
 Steven Gerber (1948–2015)
     Duo for viola and piano (1979); APNM (Association for the Promotion of New Music); Lauren Keiser Music
     Elegy on the Name "Dmitri Shostakovich" for viola solo (1991); American Composers Edition; Lauren Keiser Music
     Concerto for viola and orchestra (1995–1996); American Composers Edition; Lauren Keiser Music
 Roberto Gerhard (1896–1970)
     Sonata for viola and piano (1948); Oxford University Press
 Georg Gerson (1790–1825)
    Duetto in E major for violin and viola (1809)
 Ottmar Gerster (1897–1969)
     Concertino for viola and chamber orchestra, Op. 16 (c.1928); B. Filser Verlag; Edition Schott
     Divertimento for violin and viola (1924); Edition Schott
     Sonata No. 1 in d minor for viola and piano (1919–1922); Friedrich Hofmeister Musikverlag
     Sonata No. 2 in F for viola and piano (1954–1955); Breitkopf & Härtel
 Stefano Gervasoni (b. 1962)
     Concerto pour Alto for viola solo and 15 instruments (1994–1995); BMG Ricordi
     Masques et Berg..., 3 Duos for violin and viola (2009); Edizioni Suvini Zerboni
     Tornasole, No. 1 from Trittico Grave  for viola solo (1992–1993); BMG Ricordi
     Whisper Not, 3 Studies for viola and live electronics (2006); Edizioni Suvini Zerboni
 Diamandi Gheciu (1892–1980)
     Cîntec şi joc (Chanson et Danse) for viola and piano (1966); Uniunea, Bucharest; Editura Muzicală
 Giorgio Federico Ghedini (1892–1965)
     Concertato for flute, viola and harp (1941); Rugginenti Editore
     Contrappunti for violin, viola, cello and orchestra (1962); G. Ricordi
     Musica da Concerto for viola and string orchestra (1953); G. Ricordi
     Pezzo Concertante for 2 violins, viola and orchestra (1931); G. Ricordi
 Emmanuel Ghent (1925–2003)
     Entelechy, Concert Piece for viola and piano (1963); Oxford University Press
 Felice Giardini (1716–1796)
     Duetto in B major for violin and viola (c.1790); Gems Music Publications
     Duetto in D major for 2 violas; original from 6 Duetti per 2 violini, Op. 13 (1767); Edition Schott
     3 Duetti for viola and bassoon
     Solo per alto viola "The Billiard Sonata" in F major for viola and keyboard
 Miriam Gideon (1906–1996)
     Sonata for viola and piano (1957); American Composers Alliance
 Anthony Gilbert (b. 1934)
     Crow Undersongs for viola solo (1979–1981); Edition Schott
     Dawnfaring for viola and piano (1981–1984); Edition Schott
        Graculina
        Gymnorhina
        Manorina
     Duo for violin and viola (1963)
     Twirlpool for flute and viola (2008)
Peter Gilbert (b. 1975)
     3 Preludes for viola solo (2001)
     Si doulcement me fait Amours doloir for oboe and viola (2013)
 David Gillingham (b. 1947)
     Concerto for viola, cello and orchestra (2007); C. Alan Publications
 Bernard Gilmore (1937–2013)
     Duo for flute and viola (1969); Seesaw Music
     Suite for viola and percussion (1985)
 Tommaso Giordani (ca.1738–1806)
     Madrigal for viola and piano (1936); transcription by Vadim Borisovsky of Caro mio ben;  (State Music Publishing House)
     Sonata in B major for viola and continuo; Schott Music
 Aurelio Giorni (1895–1938)
     Sonata in D minor for cello (or viola) and piano (1925); G Schirmer
 Giovanni Mane Giornovichi (1747–1804)
     Concerto [No. 1] in D major for viola and orchestra (1773); original for violin and orchestra; transcription by Jean-Baptiste Bréval; movement II attributed to Carl Stamitz
 Ruth Gipps (1921–1999)
     Concerto for violin, viola and small orchestra, Op. 49 (1957)
     Jane Grey, Fantasy for viola and string orchestra, Op. 15 (1940)
     Lyric Fantasy for viola and piano, Op. 46 (1955); Sam Fox Publishing
 Suzanne Giraud (b. 1958)
     Élaboration for viola and piano (2000); Éditions Jobert
     Promenade du soir for viola and piano (1987); Collection Panorama: Œuvres Contemporaines, Volume 3; Éditions Gérard Billaudot
 Gaetano Giuffrè (1918–2018)
     Concerto for viola and orchestra (1958); Ricordi
     Solitude à deux, Kodályana for viola or cello and piano; Casa Musicale Sonzagno
 Peggy Glanville-Hicks (1912–1990)
     Concerto Romantico for viola and chamber orchestra (1956); American Composers Alliance; C.F. Peters
 Werner Wolf Glaser (1910–2006)
     Capriccio No. 2 for viola and piano (1963); STIM; Swedish Music Information Centre
     Pensieri for viola solo (1981); STIM; Swedish Music Information Centre
     Sonata for viola and piano (1939); STIM; Swedish Music Information Centre
     Tranquillo for violin (or flute) and viola (1946); STIM; Swedish Music Information Centre
 Paul Glass (b. 1934)
     Doppelwitz (Double Joke) for 2 violas (2004); Müller & Schade
     Vittoria for viola solo (1970); Müller & Schade
 Stanley Glasser (1926–2018)
     Four Inventions for violin and viola (1972); Piers Press
 Daniel Glaus (b. 1957)
     Chessed (Tierce en taille) from Zweite Sephiroth-Symphonie for violin and viola (2003); Müller & Schade
     Gottsplitter zerstreut for tenor, viola and organ (1987); words by Andreas Urweider; Müller & Schade
     Sonata for viola and piano (1977)
     Und Ihr werdet hören, durch den Schlaf hindurch for female voice, viola and narrator (ad libitum) (2001)
 Alexander Glazunov (1865–1936)
     Elegy (Элегия) in G minor for viola and piano, Op. 44 (1893)
 Srul Irving Glick (1934–2002)
     Concerto for viola and string orchestra (1981, revised 1990); Canadian Music Centre
     Four Yiddish Songs for voice, viola and piano (1986) or Mixed Chorus, Viola and Piano (1988); Canadian Music Centre
     Lament and Cantorial Chant for viola and string orchestra (1985); Canadian Music Centre
     A Song in Yiddish: "Es davnt der zumer" (Summer Is Praying) for voice, viola and piano (1986); Canadian Music Centre
     Suite Hebraique No. 4 for viola and piano (1978); Canadian Music Centre
     Trio for flute, viola and harp (1988); Canadian Music Centre
 Sylvia Glickman (1932–2006)
     Antigone Speaks for flute/reciter and viola (2003); Hildegard Publishing; Theodore Presser Company
 Reinhold Glière (1875–1956)
     Romance, Op. 34 (1908); 1961 transcription for viola and piano by Vadim Borisovsky
 Mikhail Glinka (1804–1857)
     Barcarolle (Баркарола) in G major from A Greeting to My Native Land (1847); original for piano; transcription for viola and piano by Vadim Borisovsky; Muzgiz; Declaration of Love: Album of Popular Pieces for Viola and Piano (Страстное Признание: Альбом Популярных Пьес), Muzyka
     Children's Polka (Детская полька; Polka Enfantine) (1854); transcription for viola and piano by Vadim Borisovsky; Muzgiz
     Mazurka (Мазурка) in C minor (1843?); transcription for viola and piano by Vadim Borisovsky; Masters Music
     Nocturne: "La Séparation" (Ноктюрн "Разлука") in D minor (1839); transcription for viola and piano by Vadim Borisovsky; Masters Music
     Sonata in D minor for viola and piano (1825–1828); unfinished; completed by Vadim Borisovsky
     Variations on Alyabyev's Romance "The Nightingale" (Вариации на романс «Соловей» А. Алябьева) (1833); original for piano; transcription for viola and piano by Vadim Borisovsky; Muzyka
 Vinko Globokar (b. 1934)
     Limites for a violinist or violist (1973); H. Litolff's Verlag
     Metamorphoses Paralleles for viola, piano and live electronics (2005); Ricordi
 Gottfried Glöckner (b. 1937)
     Bratschenstücke (Viola Pieces) for viola and piano (2011); Bellmann Musikverlag
 Rosemary Glyde (1948–1994)
     Wei-ji, Suite for 4 violas (1993)
     Whydah, Fantasia for viola solo (1993)
 Gareth Glyn (b. 1951)
     In Memoriam Cruciatorum Infantum, Concert-Piece for viola, string orchestra and harp (1987)
 Radamés Gnattali (1906–1988)
     Concerto for viola and string orchestra (1967)
     Concerto for violin, viola, cello and piano with wind orchestra (1971)
     Sonata for viola and piano (1969)
 Vladimír Godár (b. 1956)
     Bagatela (Bagatelle) for flute, viola and bassoon (1971)
     Barkarola (Barcarole) for viola solo, harp, harpsichord and string orchestra (1993, 2008)
     Dariačangin sad (Dariachanghi's Orchard), Myth after a novel by Othar Čiladze for viola, cello and orchestra (1987)
     Emmeleia for viola and piano (1994–2002)
     O Crux, meditácia (O Crux, Meditation) for viola solo (1999, 2006); original for cello solo
     Passacaglia for viola solo (2004, 2007); original for cello solo
     Sonáta na pamäť Viktora Šklovského (Sonata in Memory of Viktor Šklovský) for cello or viola and piano (1985); Opus Bratislava
     Variácie na slovenskú ľudovú pieseň (Variations on a Slovak Folk Song) for 2 violas (2006)
 Daniel Strong Godfrey (b. 1949)
     Five Character Pieces for viola and piano (1976); American Composers Alliance
     Serenata Ariosa for clarinet, viola and piano (1995)
     Three Marian Eulogies for high voice, viola and piano (1987); American Composers Alliance
     Trio for clarinet, viola and horn (1981); Margun Music
 Roger Goeb (1914–1997)
     Concertant III B for viola and double wind quintet (1952); Composers Facsimile Edition; American Composers Alliance
     Concertant III C for viola and piano (1952); American Composers Alliance
     Imagery for viola solo; American Composers Alliance
     Nuances, Duets for clarinet and viola (1986); American Composers Alliance
     Sardonic: Prelude and Dance for viola and piano; American Composers Alliance
     Sonata for Viola Alone (1941); American Composers Alliance
 Alexander Goehr (b. 1932)
     Concerto for viola and orchestra (1996)
      Double Duo for violin and 2 violas, Op. 66 (1999); Edition Schott
     Duo for 2 violas (1998); Edition Schott
     Endsong (Schlussgesang), 6 Pieces for viola and orchestra, Op. 61 (1996); Edition Schott
     Fugue on the Notes of Psalm IV for 2 solo violins, 2 solo violas and string orchestra, Op. 38c (1977); Edition Schott
     Psalm IV for soprano, alto, women's choir, viola and organ, Op. 38a (1976); Edition Schott
     Romanza on the Notes of Psalm IV for 2 solo violins, 2 solo violas and string orchestra, Op. 38c (1977); Edition Schott
     Sur terre, en l'air, 3 Pieces for viola and piano, Op. 64 (1997); Edition Schott
 Friedrich Goldmann (1941–2009)
     5 Duos for oboe and viola (2007)
     Trio in vier Sätzen (Trio in Four Movements) in for viola, cello and double bass (1986); Edition Peters
 Mikhail Goldstein (1917–1989)
     20 Little Preludes (20 kleine Präludien) for viola solo (1982); Möseler Verlag
     Quartet for 4 violas
 Marin Goleminov (1908–2000)
     Concerto for viola and orchestra (1946, 1955); composer's adaptation of the Cello Concerto No. 1 (1946); Union of Bulgarian Composers
     Little Suite (Малка сюита) for viola solo (1951); Union of Bulgarian Composers
     Sonata for violin and viola (1996); Union of Bulgarian Composers
 Jani Golob (b. 1948)
     Dialog (Dialogue) for flute and viola (1984)
     Nostalgija (Nostalgia) for 2 violas and orchestra; Društvo Slovenskih Skladateljev
     Romanca (Romance) for viola and piano (1977)
 Georg Goltermann (1824–1898)
     Andante religioso for cello or viola and harmonium or piano, Op. 56
     Gran Duo for cello or viola and piano, Op. 15
     Gran Duo for cello or viola and piano, Op. 25
     4 Morceaux de salon (4 Salon Pieces) for viola, or clarinet, or cello and piano, Op. 35
     3 Morceaux caractéristiques (3 Character Pieces) for viola or cello and piano, Op. 41 (c.1864)
     Sonatina in A major for viola and piano, Op. 36
     Sonatina in G major for viola and piano, Op. 61
 Evgeny Golubev (1910–1988)
     Concerto for viola and orchestra, Op. 47 (1961); Muzyka
     Epitaphs on the Gravestone of Fyodor Dostoyevsky (Эпитафии надгробию Ф.М. Достоевского) for viola solo, Op. 82 (1982); Sovetsky Kompozitor
 Peng-Peng Gong (b. 1992)
    Concerto for viola and orchestra, Op. 50 (2017); Keiser Southern Music
 Fernando González Casellas (1925–1998)
     Nocturno for viola and orchestra
 Enrique Gonzalez-Medina (b. 1954)
     Música para volar (Music for Flying), Fantasy for viola and piano, Op. 38 (2011)
 Arthur Murray Goodhart (1866–1941)
     Sympathy for viola and piano (1923); Augener
 Geoffrey Gordon (b. 1968)
     Bright White Smooth for flute, viola and harp (2005–2006)
     Meditation and Allegro for viola and chamber orchestra (2010)
 Henryk Górecki (1933–2010)
     Muzyczka III (Musiquette 3) for viola ensemble, Op. 25 (1967); Boosey & Hawkes
 Sandro Gorli (b. 1948)
     Amnos for 2 violins and viola (1976); Edizioni Suvini Zerboni
     Le vie dei Canti for viola, oboe and harp (1989); Ricordi
     Rondò for viola and piano (1986); Ricordi
     Super Flumina for viola, oboe and orchestra (1987); Ricordi
 Ida Gotkovsky (b. 1933)
     Invocation lyrique for viola and piano (1983); Éditions Gérard Billaudot
 Denis Gougeon (b. 1951)
     Six thèmes solaires: Alto-Neptune for viola and piano (1991); Canadian Music Centre
 Morton Gould (1913–1996)
     Concertette for viola and band (1943); G. Schirmer
     Concerto for viola and orchestra (1943); G. Schirmer
 Théodore Gouvy (1819–1898)
     Sérénade vénitienne in E minor for viola and piano (1875)
 David Gow (1924–1993)
     Carol for viola and piano (1968); Anglo-American Music Publishers
     Concerto for viola and orchestra (1992); Piper Publications
     Nocturne and Capriccio for viola and piano, Op. 31 (1952); Augener
 Hermann Grabner (1886–1969)
     2 Stücke (2 Pieces) for viola and piano, Op. 4 (1908)
     Hausmusik: Sonata in G minor for viola and piano, Op. 47 No. 4 (1938); Kistner & Siegel
     Zweigespräch for voice, viola and organ, Op. 16 (1924); C. F. Kahnt
 Ulf Grahn (b. 1942)
     Chamber Concerto for viola and 10 instruments (1975); STIM; Swedish Music Information Centre
     Duo for 2 violas (1968); STIM; Swedish Music Information Centre
     Tre miniatyrer (Three Miniatures) for viola and piano (1966) or viola and string orchestra (2006); STIM; Swedish Music Information Centre
 Percy Grainger (1882–1961)
     Arrival Platform Humlet for viola solo (1908); Editions Schott
     Foweles in the Frith, 2-Part Gymel for tenor and baritone, or tenor and viola (1910s); Bardic Edition
     The Sussex Mummers' Christmas Carol for viola and piano (1905–1911)
 Enrique Granados (1867–1916)
     Danzas españolas, Op. 37 (1892–1900); original for piano; transcriptions for viola and piano
        No. 2 Orientale
        No. 5 Andaluza
        No. 6 Rondalla aragonesa
 Philip Grange (b. 1956)
     Fantasy for viola solo (1981); Maecenas Music
     In Spectre Search for violin and viola (1994); Maecenas Music
 Julian Grant (b. 1960)
     Three Island Tales for viola and piano (2006–2007)
 Carlos Grätzer (b. 1956)
     Cinq études pour quatre altos (5 Études for 4 Violas) (2003–2005)
     Variacions sobre la repetición for viola and piano (1989)
 Lars Graugaard (b. 1957)
     Between Two for viola and piano, Op. 14 (1984–1985); Engstrøm & Sødring Musikforlag
     The Disguise Within, Concerto for viola and orchestra (1999–2000)
     Encircled for clarinet, viola and piano (1988, revised 1993)
     Flesh Echoes for 2 violas (1999)
     Ice Tong for flute, viola and guitar (1996); Engstrøm & Sødring Musikforlag
     Time Flakes for viola solo (2004)
     Trio for flute, viola and harp (1989–1990)
 Johann Gottlieb Graun (1703–1771)
     Concerto in C minor for violin, viola and basso continuo; Breitkopf und Härtel 
     Concerto in E major for viola and string orchestra, GraunWV Cv:XIII:116; N. Simrock
     Sonata No. 1 in B major for viola and harpsichord (with cello ad libitum); Breitkopf & Härtel; Edition Schott
     Sonata No. 2 in F major for viola and harpsichord (with cello ad libitum); Breitkopf & Härtel
     Sonata in C minor for viola and harpsichord (with cello ad libitum); Hans Sikorski
 Christoph Graupner (1683–1760)
     Concerto in D major for viola d'amore, viola and basso continuo, GWV 317
     Concerto in A major for viola d'amore, viola and basso continuo, GWV 339
 Matthew Greenbaum (b. 1950)
     Nod Quiet Ox for viola and piano (1994); original for oboe and piano; Tunbridge Music; Trillenium Music Company
     Per Viola Sola for viola solo (2001); American Composers Alliance
     Untimely Observations for viola and piano (2002); Tunbridge Music; Trillenium Music Company
 Stuart Greenbaum (b. 1966)
     An Angel Bowed Backward for viola and piano (1989–1991); Australian Music Centre
 Judd Greenstein (b. 1979)
     Duo 1979 for viola and Moog Prodigy (2009)
     Escape for viola solo (2004); Negative Opus Publishing; Good Child Music
     In Teaching Others We Teach Ourselves for solo viola and viola sextet (2012); Good Child Music
     The Night Gatherers for viola and string quartet (2004); Negative Opus Publishing; Good Child Music
     Summer Dances for clarinet, viola and double bass (2003); Negative Opus Publishing; Good Child Music
 Louis Gregh (1843–1915)
     Chant du Bûcheron (Lumberjack Song) for viola and piano (1904)
 Čestmír Gregor (1926–2011)
     Dolce vita, 3 Pieces for viola and piano (1990); Český Hudební Fond
     Důvěrnosti (Confidentiality) for violin and viola (1990); Český Hudební Fond
     Náklonnosti (Affection) for viola and cello (2001); Český Hudební Fond
     Trio for flute, viola and bass clarinet (1959)
 Olivier Greif (1950–2000)
     2 Pièces for viola and piano, Op. 85 (1977)
     Na Pari Tomaï for viola and piano, Op. 95 (1977); Éditions Max Eschig
     2 Pièces for viola and piano, Op. 105 (1978)
     2 Pièces for viola and piano, Op. 171 (1983)
     2 Pièces for viola and piano, Op. 174 (1983)
 Mark Gresham (b. 1956)
     3 Essays for viola and double string orchestra (2010)
 Alexander Gretchaninov (1864–1956)
     Sonata in B major for clarinet or viola and piano, Op. 161 (1935–1940)
 Geoffrey Grey (b. 1934)
    Sonata for viola and piano (1986)
 Deirdre Gribbin (b. 1967)
     North for viola solo (1995); Ireland Contemporary Music Centre
 Alexander Griboyedov (1795–1829)
     Waltz (Вальс) in D minor for viola and piano; transcription by Vadim Borisovsky (1946); Declaration of Love: Album of Popular Pieces for Viola and Piano (Страстное Признание: Альбом Популярных Пьес), Muzyka
 Galina Grigorjeva (b. 1962)
     Valge prelüüd (White Prelude: Imitating Monsieur Couperin) for baroque viola (2006)
 Helen Grime (b. 1981)
     Chasing Butterflies for 100 violas (or 8 violas, or 8-part ensemble) (2004); Scottish Music Centre
     To See the Summer Sky for violin and viola (2009); Chester Music
 Ebbe Grims-land (1915–2015)
     Bröllopsmarsch i sommartid (Wedding March in Summertime) for 2 violas (or violin and viola), double bass ad lib. (1988); STIM; Swedish Music Information Centre
     Collage de un vagabundo for 2 violas (1985); STIM; Swedish Music Information Centre
     Concerto-Gavotto per Otto (von Habsburg) for violin and viola (1984); STIM; Swedish Music Information Centre
     Ebbe und Flut for viola solo (1997); STIM; Swedish Music Information Centre
     Fantasia "Les Pyrenées" for viola or cello solo (1947); STIM; Swedish Music Information Centre
     Farväl till en skogsvän (Farewell to a Forest Friend) for viola or cello solo (1995); STIM; Swedish Music Information Centre
     Fem duetter i folkton (Scener från Adelsö) (Five Duets in Folktone: Scenes from Adelsö) for violin and viola (1989); STIM; Swedish Music Information Centre
     Frühlings-Duett: Två damers blandade vårkänslor for violin and viola (or cello) (1991); STIM; Swedish Music Information Centre
     Fünf Wiener Hörbilder for violin and viola (1989); STIM; Swedish Music Information Centre
     Haltande mobil for viola or cello solo, percussion ad lib. (1987–1992); STIM; Swedish Music Information Centre
     Hatten av för Dvořák (Hats Off to Dvořák) for viola solo (2002); STIM; Swedish Music Information Centre
     I gråmelerad skala (In Greymixed Scale) for viola or cello solo (1999); STIM; Swedish Music Information Centre
     Impromptu russo: Tonbroderi i "Vit natt" for cello or viola solo (1981); STIM; Swedish Music Information Centre
     Impulsi musicali, Suite for viola solo (1985); STIM; Swedish Music Information Centre
     Kontamination, Duo Suite for violin and viola (1999); STIM; Swedish Music Information Centre
     Kreuz und quer for viola solo (2003); STIM; Swedish Music Information Centre
     Marsch Variante ohne Generalbass for viola solo (1989); STIM; Swedish Music Information Centre
     Med speleman i täten for violin and viola (1940/1995); STIM; Swedish Music Information Centre
     Nio förvandlingar av ett skånskt tema (Nine Variations on a Scanian Theme) for viola solo (1992); STIM; Swedish Music Information Centre
     Österut (Eastward) for viola solo (1998); STIM; Swedish Music Information Centre
     Polacca Scaniensis, Duo in 3 Movements for violin and viola (1996); STIM; Swedish Music Information Centre
     Reminiszenz, 3 Movements for viola solo (or cello solo) (1996); STIM; Swedish Music Information Centre
     Rester av en 12-tonsslinga (Traces of a 12-Tone Loop) for viola solo (1982); STIM; Swedish Music Information Centre
     Skogshus, där fågeln har sitt näste (Forest Home: Where Birds Make Nest) for 2 violas or violin and viola (1997); STIM; Swedish Music Information Centre
     Slovakiskt capriccio (Slovak Capriccio) for flute and viola (1949–1952); STIM; Swedish Music Information Centre
     Så att säga (So to Speak) for viola solo (or cello solo) (1996); STIM; Swedish Music Information Centre
     Wärend-skutt for violin and viola (1996); STIM; Swedish Music Information Centre
 Gérard Grisey (1946–1998)
     Prologue for viola solo (1976); G. Ricordi
 Cor de Groot (1914–1993)
     Canto Lirico for viola and piano (1977)
     Doyna in C major for viola solo (1977)
 Eric Gross (1926–2011)
     Discussion for flute and viola, Op. 296 (2006); Australian Music Centre
     Euphonism I B for viola and piano, Op. 230 (1998); Australian Music Centre
     Invention No. 1 for viola and piano, Op. 216 No. 1a (1998); Australian Music Centre
     The Maid's Lament for mezzo-soprano, flute, viola and harp, Op. 293 (2006); Australian Music Centre
     Trialogue for mezzo-soprano (and claves), flute and viola, Op. 296a (2006); Australian Music Centre
     Violamorosa for viola and piano, Op. 268 (2002); Australian Music Centre
 Robert Gross (1914–1983)
     Sonatina for viola solo (1950s)
 Ferdinand Grossmann (1887–1970)
     Cantilena for viola and piano; Concert Music Publishing
 Stefans Grové (1922–2014)
     Concertino for viola, flute and chamber orchestra
     Duo for viola and cello (1950)
     Garden for female chorus, flute and viola (1974); words by Louis Eksteen
     Sonata for viola and piano (1994)
 Gabriel Grovlez (1879–1944)
     Romance, Scherzo et Finale for viola and piano (1931); Éditions Heugel
 Czesław Grudziński (1911–1992)
     Miniatury (Miniatures) for viola and piano (1953); Polskie Wydawnictwo Muzyczne
 Juozas Gruodis (1884–1948)
     Jūros daina (Song of the Sea) for viola and piano (1933); from the ballet Jūratė ir Kastytis; published by Vaga, Vilnius, in Dvi pjesės altui su fortepijonu (2 Pieces for Viola and Piano)
 Jorge Grundman (b. 1961)
     First Rays of Light on Wet Asphalt for viola and piano, Op. 71 (2014/2020)
     Photographs and Memories for viola and piano, Op. 73 (2020)
 Friedrich Grützmacher (1832–1903)
     Romanze in F minor for viola and orchestra (or string quartet, or piano), Op. 19 No. 2 (1851)
 Camargo Guarnieri (1907–1993)
     Choro for viola and orchestra (1975)
     Sonata for viola and piano (1950); J. Carboni, São Paulo
 Carlos Guastavino (1912–2000)
     Sonata for clarinet or viola and piano (1971)
 Sofia Gubaidulina (b. 1931)
     Garten von Freuden und Traurigkeiten (The Garden of Joy and Sorrow) for flute, viola, harp and narrator (1980); H. Sikorski
     Quasi hoquetus for viola, bassoon and piano (1984); H. Sikorski
     And: The Feast Is in Full Procession for viola and orchestra (1993)
     Concerto for viola and orchestra (1996); G. Schirmer
     Two Paths: A Dedication to Mary and Martha for 2 violas solo and orchestra (1998)
 César Guerra-Peixe (1914–1993)
     Bilhete de um jogral (Note from a Minstrel) for viola solo (1983); Funarte; Academia Brasileira de Música
     Duo for violin and viola (1946)
     Miniaturas for viola and piano (1958)
     Três peças (3 Pieces) for viola and piano (1957); Academia Brasileira de Música
 Ronan Guilfoyle (b. 1958)
     Sonata for viola solo (2002); Contemporary Music Centre Ireland
     Sonata for viola and piano (2001); Contemporary Music Centre Ireland
 René Guillou (1903–1958)
     Élégie for viola (or English horn) and piano (1927); Henry Lemoine
 Joan Guinjoan (1931–2019)
     Dúo for viola and piano (1979)
     Micrótono for viola solo (1980); Éditions Amphion; United Music Publishers
 Dwight Gustafson (1930–2014)
     Meditation on "What Wondrous Love", Appalachian Hymn for viola, string orchestra and harp (1991); Pinner Publications
 Gene Gutchë (1907–2000)
     Interlude for viola and piano, Op. 25 (1956); The Schubert Club
 Benjamín Gutiérrez (b. 1937)
     Concerto sobre un Canto Bribri (Concerto on a Bribri Song) for viola and orchestra (1982–1983)
 Barry Guy (b. 1947)
     Um 1788 for violin, viola, cello, double bass and string orchestra (1989); Novello & Co.

H
 Georg Friedrich Haas (b. 1953)
     ...., Double Concerto for accordion, viola and chamber ensemble (1994); Universal Edition
     ....... for viola and 6 voices (2006); Universal Edition
     "... aus freier Lust ... verbunden ..." for various ensembles (including for viola solo; for viola, cello and double bass) (1994–1996); Universal Edition
     Les temps tiraillés for 2 violas, bassoon and electronics (2008); Universal Edition
     Sextet for 3 violas and 3 cellos (1982); Universal Edition
 Alois Hába (1893–1973)
     Concerto for viola and orchestra, Op. 86 (1956–1957); Filmkunst-Musikverlag
     Fantasy for viola and quarter-tone piano, Op. 32 (1926)
 Daron Hagen (b. 1961)
     Divertimento for viola, harp and vibraphone (1983)
     Harp Trio for flute, viola and harp (1988–1989); E.C. Schirmer Publishing
     Suite for viola solo (1986); E.C. Schirmer Publishing
 Reynaldo Hahn (1875–1947)
     Romanesque for flute, viola and piano (1910)
     Soliloque et Forlane for viola and piano (1937); Éditions Max Eschig
 Adolphus Hailstork (b. 1941)
     As Falling Leaves for flute, viola and harp (2002); Theodore Presser Company
     Divertimento for violin and viola; Theodore Presser Company
     Fantasy Piece for viola and piano (2002); Theodore Presser Company
     Four Lyric Pieces for viola and piano
     Sanctum, Rhapsody for viola and piano (1995); Theodore Presser Company
     Two Romances for viola and chamber orchestra (1997); Theodore Presser Company
     Variations on a Guyanese Folksong for violin or viola and piano
 Andre Hajdu (1932–2016)
     Instants suspendus, 12 Preludes for viola solo (1978); also for cello or violin solo
 Lóránt Hajdú (b. 1937)
     Two Movements for viola solo (1974)
 Uzeyir Hajibeyov (1885–1948)
        Azerbaijan Folk Song (Азербайджанская народная песня) for viola and piano;  (State Music Publishing House)
 Kimmo Hakola (b. 1958)
     Double Concerto for violin, viola and orchestra, Op. 97 (2017); Fennica Gehrman
 Cristóbal Halffter (1930–2021)
     Alucinaciones (Hallucinations), Collage for viola, cello, and double bass (trio basso) with orchestra (2015); Universal Edition
     Concerto for viola and orchestra (2014); Universal Edition
     Doble concierto en dos movimientos (Double Concerto in Two Movements) for violin, viola and orchestra (1985); Universal Edition
     Leyendo a Jorge Guillén for speaker, viola and cello (1982); Universal Edition
     Trio basso for viola, cello and double bass (2014); Universal Edition
 Richard Hall (1903–1982)
     Suite for violin and viola (1953); Hinrichsen Edition
 Bengt Hallberg (1932–2013)
     Två norrlandslåtar (Two Norrland Songs) for viola and chamber orchestra (1977); Sveriges Radios Musikbibliotek
 Hermann Haller (1914–2002)
     Episoden for viola and orchestra (1989)
     3 Nocturnes for viola and piano (1972); Edizioni Pegasus
 Hafliði Hallgrímsson (b. 1941)
     Botticelli Fragments for viola and cello, Op. 34 (2005); Íslenzk Tónverkamiðstöð
     Dagbókarbrot (Notes from a Diary) for viola and piano, Op. 33 (2005); Chester Music
     Ombra for viola and string orchestra, Op. 27 (1999); Chester Music
 Joseph Hallman (b. 1979)
     Ironies, 5 Bagatelles for viola and piano (2001)
 Dietmar Hallmann (b. 1935)
     6 Bagatelles for viola and piano (2003)
     Ballata virtuosità for viola solo (1984); Editions Peters
     Fantasie Nr. 13 im Stile Telemanns (Fantasie No. 13 in the Style of Telemann) for viola solo (2003)
 Eyvind Hallnäs (b. 1937)
     Sonatina for viola and piano (1986); STIM; Swedish Music Information Centre
 Hilding Hallnäs (1903–1984)
     Concerto for viola and orchestra (1976–1978); STIM; Swedish Music Information Centre
     Legend for viola and piano (1945); Musikaliska Konstföreningen; Swedish Music Information Centre
     Sonata for viola and piano, Op. 19 (1943); Musikaliska Konstföreningen; Swedish Music Information Centre
     Spel för två (Jeux à deux) for clarinet and viola (1960); STIM; Swedish Music Information Centre
 Johan Halvorsen (1864–1935)
     Passacaglia on a Theme of Händel in G minor for violin and viola (1894)
     Sarabande con Variazioni on a Theme of Händel in D minor for violin and viola (1894)
 Eero Hämeenniemi (b. 1951)
     Concerto for viola and orchestra (2001)
 Iain Hamilton (1922–2000)
     Sinfonia Concertante for violin, viola and chamber orchestra (1989)
     Sonata for viola and piano, Op. 9 (1950–1951); Edition Schott
 George Frideric Handel (1685–1759)
     Concerto in B minor for viola and orchestra (published 1924); missattributed to Handel, but actually composed by Henri Casadesus
 Harutyun Hanesyan (1911–1987)
     Andantino for viola (or violin) and piano (1960); Éditions Max Eschig
     Élégie for viola (or cello) and piano (published 1930s); Éditions Max Eschig
     Menuetto for viola (or cello) and piano (published 1930s); Éditions Max Eschig
     Nocturne for viola (or cello) and piano (published 1930s); Éditions Max Eschig
     Pastorale et rondo for viola and piano (1960); Éditions Max Eschig
     Prélude et caprice for viola and piano (1960); Éditions Max Eschig
     Romance for viola and piano (1962); Éditions Max Eschig
 Peter Hannan (b. 1953)
     RSRCH 11/87 for viola solo (1987); Canadian Music Centre
 Norbert von Hannenheim (1898–1945)
     Duo for violin and viola
     Sonata No. 1 for viola and piano
     Sonata No. 2 for viola and piano (1937)
     Stück Nr. 1 (Piece No. 1) for viola and piano
     Stück Nr. 3 (Piece No. 3) for viola and piano
     Stück Nr. 4 (Piece No. 4) for viola and piano
     Suite for viola and piano (1937)
 Olga Hans (b. 1971)
     Dialogi (Dialogues) for 2 violas (1994)
     Dialogi 2 (Dialogues 2) for viola and cello (1997)
     Da suonare a tre for viola, cello and piano (1996)
 Peter Hänsel (1770–1831)
     3 Duos for violin and viola, Op. 26 (c.1810?); Amadeus Verlag
     Trois thémas variés for violin and viola, Op. 4 (c.1800); A.J. Heuwekemeijer
 Howard Hanson (1896–1981)
     Lux aeterna, Symphonic Poem for orchestra with viola obligato, Op. 24 (1923–1926); G. Schirmer
     Summer Seascape No. 2 for viola and string orchestra (1965)
 Jan Hanuš (1915–2004)
     Diptych for viola solo, Op. 115 No. 2 (1988–1989); Český Hudební Fond
     Sonatina for viola and piano, Op. 37 (1956); Artia; Český Hudební Fond
 Barbara Harbach (b. 1946)
     Rustic Scene for viola and piano (2004); Vivace Press
 John Harbison (b. 1938)
     Cucaraccia and Fugue for viola quartet (2003); Associated Music Publishers
     Concerto for viola and orchestra (1988); Associated Music Publishers
     Sonata for viola solo (1961); Associated Music Publishers
     The Violist's Notebook, Book 1 (2002); Associated Music Publishers
     The Violist's Notebook, Book 2 (2002); Associated Music Publishers
 Carl Gilbert Hardebeck (1869–1945)
     The Lark in the Clear Air for viola and piano (1927); Augener Editions
 Kenneth Harding (1903–1992)
     Concertante for 4 violas (1950) or 5 violas (1972)
     Concerto for viola and orchestra (1950)
     Divertimento for 4 violas (1949); Corda Music Publications
     Duet Rhapsody for soprano and viola (1952)
     June Sunrise – Blue Sky, Idyll for 12 violas (1978)
     Kammersymphonie for 9 violas (1956)
     Legend for viola and piano (1985)
     Metamorphsen for viola and string orchestra (1981)
     Moonlit Apples for viola and piano (1979); Comus Edition
     Phantasy of Light, Phantasy-Scherzo for 4 violas (1990)
     Poem No. 1 for viola and piano (1931); Comus Edition
     Renata da Capo for 10 violas (1987); Comus Edition
     Rondo Capriccio for 6 violas (1986); Corda Music Publications
     Scherzo (Enigma) for violin and viola (published 1950); J. & W. Chester
     Sonata for viola and piano (1979); Comus Edition
     Sonatina for 2 violas (1951); Comus Edition
     Suite for 3 violas (1980)
     Sunset Paradise for 7 violas (1986)
     Where the Willows Meet for viola and piano (1990)
 Halina Harelava (b. 1951)
     Al Sereno, Concert Fantasy for viola and piano (1998)
     Concerto for viola, string orchestra and bells (2000); Sordino Ediziuns Musicalas
     Eine kleine Nachtmusik for viola and piano (2001)
     Introduction and Fantasy on a Ragtime Theme for viola and piano (2003)
     Lucia perpetuo moto for viola and piano (2001)
 James Harley (b. 1959)
     Here the Bird for viola and piano (1993); Canadian Music Centre
 Chris Harman (b. 1970)
     Sonata for viola and piano (1991)
     Uta, Concerto for viola and orchestra (1999–2000); Canadian Music Centre
 Ross Harris (b. 1945)
     Chaconne for solo viola (2003); Centre for New Zealand Music
     Trio for flute, viola and harp (1973); Centre for New Zealand Music
 Roy Harris (1898–1979)
     Elegy and Paean for viola and orchestra (1948)
     Lamentation for soprano, viola and piano (1944); Belwin Mills
     Soliloquy and Dance for viola and piano (1938); G. Schirmer
 William Henry Harris (1883–1973)
     Suite for viola and piano (1952); Oxford University Press
 Julius Harrison (1885–1963)
     Sonata in C minor for viola and piano (1945); Alfred Lengnick
 Lou Harrison (1917–2003)
     Threnody for Carlos Chávez for gamelan degung and viola (1978); Music for Gamelan and Western Instr.
 Pamela Harrison (1915–1990)
     Lament for viola and piano (published 1963); Augener; Galaxy Music
     Sonata for viola and piano (1946); PH Music; British Music Information Centre
 Sadie Harrison (b. 1965)
      3 Dances for Diana Nemorensis for viola solo (2013); University of York Music Press
 Tibor Harsányi (1898–1954)
     Sonata for viola and piano (1953–1954); Alphonse Leduc
 Walter Hartley (1927–2016)
     Lyric Suite for viola, tenor saxophone and piano, Op. 189 (1993); To the Fore Publishers
     Sonata for viola and piano, Op. 18 (1952); Interlochen Press; Wingert-Jones Music
     Three Duets for violin and viola, Op. 34 (1959); Interlochen Press; Wingert-Jones Music
 Karl Amadeus Hartmann (1905–1963)
     Konzert für Bratsche mit Klavier (Concerto for Viola with Piano) for viola, piano, wind instruments and percussion (1954–1956); Edition Schott
 Jonathan Harvey (1939–2012)
     Chant for viola solo (1992–1994); Faber Music
     Jubilus for viola and chamber ensemble (2003); Faber Music
 Richard Harvey (b. 1953)
     Concerto for viola and orchestra (1990)
     Reflections for viola and small orchestra (1990, 2012)
 Gotfrid Hasanov (Gasanov) (1900–1965)
     Rhapsody (Рапсодия) for viola and orchestra (1965)
 Christos Hatzis (b. 1953)
     From the Vanishing Gardens of Eden for 12 violas and tape (1992); Promethean Editions
     The Mega4 Meta4, Fifth Piece of the Earthrise Cycle for viola and tape (1990); Promethean Editions
     Nadir for recorder (or flute), viola and tape (1988); Promethean Editions
     Pyrrichean Dances for viola, percussion and string orchestra (2001); Promethean Editions
     Rebirth for viola and orchestra (2006); Promethean Editions
 Roman Haubenstock-Ramati (1919–1994)
     Multiple 1 for 2 players (2 violas, or viola and cello, etc.) (1969); Universal Edition
 Hans Haug (1900–1967)
     Fantasia Concertante for viola and orchestra (1964); Edizioni Curci
 Teppo Hauta-aho (1941–2021)
     Adagio e Scherzo for viola solo (1972); Edition Fazer; Fennica Gehrman; Warner/Chappell Music Finland; Finnish Music Information Centre
     Duettino for violin and viola (1990); Finnish Music Information Centre
     Gunthrope Phantasy III for viola and double bass (1990); Finnish Music Information Centre
     Homage à Rossini for viola and double bass (1980); Finnish Music Information Centre
     3 Pieces for viola solo (1982); Finnish Music Information Centre
     Puukenkätanssi (Clog Dance) for viola (or violin, or cello) and piano (1990); Finnish Music Information Centre
     Tuokioita (Moments) for viola and piano (1975); Finnish Music Information Centre
     Viola-aaria for viola and piano (1988); Finnish Music Information Centre
 Svatopluk Havelka (1925–2009)
     Tichá radost (Quiet Joy) for viola solo (1985); Český Hudební Fond
 Hanna Havrylets (1958–2022)
     А-Cordа, Sinfonietta for viola and string orchestra (2001)
     Concerto for viola and orchestra (1984)
     Sonata for viola and piano (1988)
 Hikaru Hayashi (1931–2012)
     Vines (蔓枝) for viola solo
     Viola Concerto "Elegia" (悲歌) for viola and string orchestra (1995); Zen-On Music
     Viola Sonata "Process" (プロセス) for viola and piano (2002)
 Joseph Haydn (1732–1809)
     Duet in C major for 2 violas, Hob. XII:4; originally in G major for 2 Barytons; Walter Wollenweber
     6 Sonatas for violin and viola, Hob. VI:1–6; Verlag Doblinger
 Michael Haydn (1737–1806)
     Concerto (Duo Concertante) in C major for viola, organ (or harpsichord) and string orchestra, MH 41, P. 55
     Duo (Sonata) in C major for violin and viola, MH 335, P. 127 (1783)
     Duo (Sonata) in D major for violin and viola, MH 336, P. 128
     Duo (Sonata) in E major for violin and viola, MH 337, P. 129
     Duo (Sonata) in F major for violin and viola, MH 338, P. 130
 Xuntian He (b. 1952)
     Whirling Udumbara II (优昙波罗旋转舞II) for viola, cello and He-drum (2012); Schott Music
 Christopher Headington (1930–1996)
     Adagio and Capriccio for viola and piano (1966)
 Derek Healey (b. 1936)
     From the West, 4 Pieces for viola solo, Op. 72 (1990) or for viola and piano, Op. 72b (2002); Canadian Music Centre
     A Northern Phantasy for clarinet, viola and piano, Op. 105 (2006); Canadian Music Centre
 Anthony Hedges (1931–2019)
     Companion Pieces for violin or viola and piano, Op. 133; Piper Publications
     Simon's Samba for viola and piano (1985); Westfield Music
     Sonatina for viola and piano, Op. 91 (1982, revised 1993); Westfield Music
 David Philip Hefti (b. 1975)
     con anima, Mosaik (Mosaic) for viola solo (2015); Edition Kunzelmann
     Poème lunaire for viola and piano (2008); Edition Kunzelmann
 Lars Hegaard (b. 1950)
     Different Worlds for viola and orchestra (2001); Edition Samfundet
     13 Short Pieces for flute, viola and harp (1990); Edition Samfundet
 Bernhard Heiden (1910–2000)
     Sonata for viola and piano (1958); Associated Music Publishers
 Paavo Heininen (1938–2022)
     Cantilena I for viola solo, Op. 24 (1970); Fennica Gehrma
 Heinrich XXIV, Prinz Reuss (1855–1910)
     Sonata in G major for viola and piano, Op. 22 (1904)
 Steve Heitzeg (b. 1959)
     Seven Tree Prayers for viola solo (2000); Stone Circle Music
     When Violets Appear for viola and piano (2004); Stone Circle Music
 Walter Hekster (1937–2012)
     Occurrence for viola solo (1969); Donemus
     Parts of a World for viola and orchestra (1976); Donemus
     Towards Dawn for viola and piano (2001)
     Trio for clarinet, viola and piano (1990); Donemus
 Piers Hellawell (b. 1956)
     Inside Story for violin, viola and orchestra (1999); Maecenas Music
 Barbara Heller (b. 1936)
     Nah oder fern (Near or Far) for viola solo (1982, 1987–1988); Moeck Verlag; Edition Schott
 Henrik Hellstenius (b. 1963)
     The Golden Shield for viola and piano (1996); Music Information Centre Norway
 Everett Helm (1913–1999)
     Sonata for viola and piano (1944)
 Oscar van Hemel (1892–1981)
     Concerto for viola and orchestra (1951); Donemus
     Sonata for viola and piano (1942); Heuwekemeijer Amsterdam
     Trio for violin, viola and piano (1937); Donemus
 Wim Henderickx (1962–2022)
     Raga III for viola and orchestra (1995); CeBeDeM
     Searching for viola and marimba (1986); CeBeDeM
 Moya Henderson (b. 1941)
     Ku-ring-gai Chase for violin, viola and cello soli with orchestra (1999); Australian Music Centre
     Tracker's Song from Act III of Lindy for viola and piano (1997); Australian Music Centre
 Hans Henkemans (1913–1995)
     Concerto for viola and orchestra (1950); Donemus
 Christian Henking (b. 1961)
     9 Fragmente (9 Fragments) for viola and piano (1985); Müller & Schade
     Stück (Piece) for 5 violas (or 5 cellos) (1989–1997); Müller & Schade
 Swan Hennessy (1866–1929)
     Sonatine celtique in C minor for viola and piano, Op. 62 (1924); title on the cover of the print reads Sonate celtique, on the first page of music it is "Sonatine"; Max Eschig & Cie.
     Quatre Morceaux (4 Pieces) for viola or alto saxophone and piano, Op. 71 (1929); Éditions Max Eschig
     Deuxième Sonatine (Sonatine No. 2) for violin or viola and piano, Op. 80 (1929); Propriété de l'auteur (self-published)
 Hans Werner Henze (1926–2012)
     An Brenton, Song for viola solo (1993); Edition Schott
     Compases para Preguntos Ensimismadas for viola and 22 players (1969–1970); Edition Schott
     Selbst- und Zwiegespräche, Trio for viola, guitar and chamber organ (1984–1985); Edition Schott
     Serenade for viola solo (1949, 2003); original for cello solo; adapted by Garth Knox; Edition Schott
     Sonata for viola and piano (1978–1979); Edition Schott
 Jörg Herchet (b. 1943)
     Komposition (Composition) for oboe and viola (1973); Breitkopf & Härtel
 Rházes Hernández-López (1918–1991)
     Sonata for viola and piano (1952)
 Ferdinand Hérold (1791–1833)
     4 Sonatas for viola and piano
 Philippe Hersant (b. 1948)
     Duo Séphardim for viola and bassoon (1993); Éditions Durand
     Huit Duos (8 Duos) for viola and bassoon (1995); Éditions Durand
     Musical Humors, Concerto for viola and string orchestra (2003); Éditions Durand
     Pavane for viola solo (1987); Éditions Durand
     Six Bagatelles for clarinet, viola and piano (2007); Éditions Durand
     Tenebrae for viola and piano (2005); Éditions Durand
     Trois Nocturnes for flute, viola and harp (2001); Éditions Durand
 Michael Hersch (b. 1971)
     After Hölderlin's Hälfte des Lebens for viola and cello (2002)
     Sonata for unaccompanied viola (1993)
 William Herschel (1738–1822)
     Concerto No. 1 in C major for viola, string orchestra and continuo (1759)
     Concerto No. 2 in D minor for viola, string orchestra and continuo (1759)
     Concerto No. 3 in F major for viola, string orchestra and continuo (1759)
 Heinrich von Herzogenberg (1843–1900)
     3 Legenden (3 Legends) for viola and piano, Op. 62 (1889)
 Ernst Hess (1912–1968)
     Concerto for viola, cello and chamber orchestra, Op. 20
     Suite for viola solo, Op. 14 (1936)
 Willy Hess (1906–1997)
     Double Concerto in F major for violin, viola and orchestra, Op. 81 (1974); Amadeus Verlag
     Duo in C major for flute and viola, Op. 89 (1977); Amadeus Verlag
     Sonata in C major for viola solo, Op. 77 (1972–1973); Amadeus Verlag
     Sonata in C minor for viola and bassoon (or cello), Op. 78 (1973); Amadeus Verlag
     Sonate in altem Stil (Sonata in Old Style) for viola and harp or piano, Op. 135 (1989); Amadeus Verlag
 Kurt Hessenberg (1908–1994)
     Sonata for viola and piano, Op. 94 (1974); Edition Schott
     Zwei kleine Stücke (Two Little Pieces) for 2 violas (c.1955); Edition Schott
 Jacques Hétu (1938–2010)
     Variations for viola solo, Op. 11 (1967, 1984); Éditions Doberman-Yppan
 Thomas Hewitt Jones (b. 1984)
     Romance for viola and piano (2009); Metronome Music Ltd.
 Walter Thomas Heyn (b. 1953)
     Berliner Musike III for viola and piano, Op. 53b; Verlag Neue Musik
     Es fallen die Gedanken in mein Gemüt wie Schnee for viola and guitar, Op. 26; Verlag Neue Musik
     Silicernium III for viola and chamber orchestra, Op. 102
 Frigyes Hidas (1928–2007)
     Concerto for viola and orchestra (1959)
 Jennifer Higdon (b. 1962)
     Concerto for viola and orchestra (2015)
     Sonata for viola and piano (1990); Lawdon Press
 Alfred Hill (1869–1960)
     Concerto in A minor for viola and orchestra (1940); Southern Music Publishing, Sydney; Peer Music
 Anthony Herschel Hill (1939–2016)
     Two Pieces for viola and piano (1982); Stainer & Bell
 Wilhelm Hill (1838–1902)
     Notturno, Scherzo und Romanze for viola and piano, Op. 18 (1868)
     2 Romanzen (2 Romances) for cello or viola and piano, Op. 22 (1869)
 Anders Hillborg (b. 1954)
     Atlas Peak Airs for viola and piano (2020–2021); Faber Music
     Concerto for viola and orchestra (2021); Faber Music
     Musik för 10 altvioliner (Music for 10 Violas) (1987, 1993); Swedish Music Information Centre
 Lejaren Hiller (1924–1994)
     Diabelskie skrzypce (The Devil's Violin) for violin, or viola, or cello and harpsichord, Op. 58 (1978); Kallisti Music Press
 Paul Hindemith (1895–1963)
     Duett (Scherzo) for viola and cello (1934); Edition Schott
     Der Schwanendreher for viola and small orchestra (1935); Edition Schott
     Kammermusik No. 5 for viola and chamber orchestra, Op. 36 No. 4 (1927); Edition Schott
     Konzertmusik for viola and large chamber orchestra, Op. 48 (1930); Edition Schott
     Meditation from Nobilissima visione for viola and piano (1938); Edition Schott
     Sonata for solo viola, Op. 11 No. 5 (1919); Edition Schott
     Sonata for solo viola, Op. 25 No. 1 (1922); Edition Schott
     Sonata for solo viola, Op. 31 No. 4 (1923); Edition Schott
     Sonata for solo viola (1937); Edition Schott
     Sonata in F for viola and piano, Op. 11 No. 4 (1919); Edition Schott
     Sonata for viola and piano, Op. 25 No. 4 (1922); Edition Schott
     Sonata for viola and piano (1939); Edition Schott
     Trauermusik for viola and string orchestra (1936); Edition Schott
     Trio for viola, heckelphone (or tenor saxophone) and piano, Op. 47 (1928); Edition Schott
 Matthew Hindson (b. 1968)
     2 + 5 <> 6 for violin or viola solo (2004, 2008); Faber Music
     Basement Art Guru for violin or viola solo (2004, 2008); Faber Music
     Chrissietina's Magic Fantasy for violin and viola (1998); Faber Music
     Lament for viola and piano (1996–2002); Faber Music
     Prelude and Estampie for viola and piano (1986); Faber Music
     Repetepetition for violin or viola solo (2004, 2008); Faber Music
     Siegfried Interlude No. 4 – The Ride of the (Viola) Valkyries for 8 violas (1998); Faber Music
     Two Marine Portraits for violin, viola and electronics (1997); Faber Music
 Alistair Hinton (b. 1950)
     Après une lecture de Liszt for viola and double bass, Op. 43 (2001); The Sorabji Archive
 Caspar René Hirschfeld (b. 1965)
     Canto Largo for viola and harp, Op. 82b (2001)
     Canto Largo for violin, viola (or saxophone) and orchestra (2020)
     Elegie for oboe, viola and harp, Op. 85 (2001)
     3 Miniaturen (3 Miniatures) (also known as 3 Movements) for viola solo, Op. 115 (2012)
     Musik für Viola Solo (Music) for viola solo, Op. 130 (2016)
     ...wie des Grases Blumen..., Elegy for viola solo, Op. 134 (2017)
     Zikaden for viola and tape (2015)
 Jim Hiscott (b. 1948)
     The Bay of Naples for viola and button accordion (2004)
     H.M. for viola solo (1984); Canadian Music Centre
     Spiral for 2 violas (2003)
     Romantic Nights for viola and 2 percussionists (1993); Canadian Music Centre
 Emil Hlobil (1901–1987)
     Contemplazione for viola and string orchestra, Op. 75 (1969); Český Hudební Fond
 Gilad Hochman (b. 1982)
     Akeda (The Binding of Isaac) for viola solo (2006)
     Rhapsody for cello (or viola) solo (2003); Israeli Music Center
 Alun Hoddinott (1929–2008)
     Concertino for viola and small orchestra, Op. 14 (1958); Oxford University Press
 Margriet Hoenderdos (1952–2010)
     December '02 for viola solo (2002)
     Februari '03 for viola solo (2003)
     Lex inertiae No. 2 for viola solo (1989)
 Bernard Hoffer (b. 1934)
     Concerto for viola and orchestra (1993)
     Sonata for viola and piano (1992)
 Paul Höffer (1895–1949)
     Bratschen-Musik mit Klavier (Viola Music with Piano) (1946); Mitteldeutscher Verlag
 Joel Hoffman (b. 1953)
     Abbassare for viola solo (1976, 2007); Onibatan Music
     départs for viola solo (2009); Onibatan Music
     Double Concerto for viola, cello and orchestra (1984); Onibatan Music
     Duo for Viola and Piano (1983); Onibatan Music
     Krakow Variations for viola solo (1999); Onibatan Music
     Triple Concerto for violin, viola, cello and orchestra (1978); Onibatan Music
 Richard Hoffmann (1925–2021)
     Duo for viola and cello (1949, 1965); Mobart Music Publications
 Franz Anton Hoffmeister (1754–1812)
     Concerto in B major for viola and orchestra
     Concerto in D major for viola and orchestra
     3 Duos Concertants for flute and viola (1789–1790)
     3 Duos for violin and viola, Op. 6; original for violin and cello
     3 Duos for violin and viola, Op. 7
     6 Duos for violin and viola, Op. 13
     6 Duos for violin and viola, Op. 19 (1788)
     6 Duos for violin and viola, Op. 65 (c.1803)
     12 Etudes for solo viola
 Richard Hofmann (1844–1918)
     Acht Übungs- und Vortrags-Stücke (8 Exercise and Lecture Pieces) for violin and viola, Op. 82 (1892)
     Die ersten Etüden für Viola: Zwanzig Studien in der ersten Lage (The First Etudes for Viola: 20 Studies in First Position) for viola solo, Op. 86 (1893)
     15 Etüden für Viola mit Anwendung verschiedener Lagen zum Gebrauche für vorgeschrittne Spieler (15 Etudes for Viola with Application in Different Positions for Advanced Players) for viola solo, Op. 87 (1893)
     Sonatine für angehende Spieler (Sonatina for Advancing Players) in F major for viola (or flute) and piano, Op. 46 (1885)
     Viola Schule: Praktischer Lehrgang in drei Teilen (Viola School: Practical Course in Three Parts), Op. 40
 Hendrik Hofmeyr (b. 1957)
     Partita for viola solo (2001)
     Sonata for viola and piano (2017)
 Lee Hoiby (1926–2011)
     Ciaconetta for viola and piano (1990); Theodore Presser Company
 Josef Holbrooke (1878–1958)
     Nocturne: Fairyland for viola, oboe and piano, Op. 57 No. 1 (1900); Rudall, Carte & Co.
 Trevor Hold (1939–2004)
     Duo for violin and viola, Op. 13; British Music Information Centre
     Topsy-Turvy World for contralto, viola and piano (1999); poem by William Brighty Rands
     The Weathercock, Fantasia for viola and piano, Op. 17 (1965); British Music Information Centre
 Lee Holdridge (b. 1944)
     Concerto for viola and chamber orchestra
 Dulcie Holland (1913–2000)
     Follow Me for violin, viola and piano (1987); Australian Music Centre
     Sonatina for viola and piano (1932); Australian Music Centre
     Summer Afternoon for viola and piano (1995); Australian Music Centre
 Theodore Holland (1878–1947)
     Ellingham Marshes for viola and orchestra (1940); Hinrichsen Edition
     Suite in D for viola and piano (1935); Boosey & Hawkes
 Karl Höller (1907–1987)
     Sonata for cello or viola and piano, Op. 31 (1943, revised 1967); original 1943 work for cello and piano; Henry Litolff's Verlag; Edition Peters
     Sonata in E minor "In Memoriam Paul Hindemith" for viola and piano, Op. 62 (1967); Edition Schott
 Alan Holley (b. 1954)
     The Winged Viola for viola and ensemble (2004)
 Heinz Holliger (b. 1939)
     Recicanto for viola and small orchestra (2000–2001); Schott Music
     Souvenirs de Davos III for viola solo (1999–2000); Schott Music
     Souvenirs trémaësques for viola solo (2001); Schott Music
     Three Machaut Transcriptions for 3 violas; Schott Music
     Three Sketches for violin and viola (2006); Schott Music
     Trema for viola solo (1980); Schott Music
     Trio for oboe, viola and harp (1966); Schott Music
 Robin Holloway (b. 1943)
     Concerto for viola and small orchestra, Op. 56 (1984); Boosey & Hawkes
     Sonata for viola and piano, Op. 87 (1999)
     Trio for clarinet, viola and piano, Op. 79 (1993–1994); Boosey & Hawkes
 Vagn Holmboe (1909–1996)
     Concertino No. 1 for violin, viola and string orchestra, Op. 22 (1940); Edition Wilhelm Hansen
     Concerto for violin, viola and orchestra, Op. 39; Edition Wilhelm Hansen
     Concerto for viola, oboe and small orchestra, Op. 67; Edition Wilhelm Hansen
     Concerto No. 1 for viola and orchestra, Op. 31, M. 141 (1943); Edition Wilhelm Hansen
     Concerto No. 2 for viola and orchestra, Op. 189, M. 357 (1991–1992); Edition Wilhelm Hansen
     Duo Concertante for violin and viola, Op. 83; Edition Wilhelm Hansen
     Sonata for viola solo, Op. 178 (1988); Edition Wilhelm Hansen
 Leonie Holmes (b. 1962)
     Recitative II for viola and percussion (1991); Sounz New Zealand
 Gustav Holst (1874–1934)
     Lyric Movement for viola and small orchestra, H. 191 (1933); Oxford University Press
     Terzetto for flute, oboe and viola, H. 158 (1925); Chester Music
 Imogen Holst (1907–1984)
     Duo for viola and piano (1968)
     4 Easy Pieces for viola and piano (1935); Augener Editions
     Joyce's Divertimento for solo viola and orchestra (1976); Sphemusations Edition
     Prometheus, Incidental Music for soprano, mezzo-soprano, baritone, chorus and viola (1950)
     Serenade for flute, viola and bassoon (1942)
     Suite for viola solo (1930); British Music Information Centre
     Terzetto for flute, oboe and viola (1925); Chester Music
 Patricia Blomfield Holt (1910–2003)
     Metamorphosis for viola and piano (1985); Berandol Music; Canadian Music Centre
     Suite No. 2 for violin or viola and piano (1939); BMI Canada; Canadian Music Centre
 Simon Holt (b. 1958)
     Mantis for viola solo (2005); Chester Music
     the other side of silence for flute, viola and harp (2004); Chester Music
     walking with the river's roar for viola and orchestra (1990–1991, revised 2006); Chester Music
 Ignaz Holzbauer (1711–1783)
     Concerto in E major for viola, cello and string orchestra (c.1742–1750); Edition Eulenburg
 Joaquim Homs (1906–2003)
     2 Monòlegs (2 Monologues) for viola (or cello) solo (1979–1980); Dinsic Publicacions Musicals
     Seqüència for viola (or cello) solo (1982); Dinsic Publicacions Musicals
 Arthur Honegger (1892–1955)
     Sonata for viola and piano, H. 28 (1920)
 David Hönigsberg (1959–2005)
     Haiku Screen for tenor or light baritone, viola and harp (1982)
     On Meeting Miss Fairfax for the First Time for viola and piano, Op. 52 (1987)
     3 Pictures of an African Life, Concerto for viola and large orchestra (or 2 pianos and percussion) (1989)
     Trio for viola, cello and piano (1988)
     Via cruxis for alto, clarinet and viola (2004)
 Katherine Hoover (1937–2018)
     El Andalus for cello (or viola) and piano (2003); Papagena Press
     Shadows for viola and piano (2001); Papagena Press
 David Horne (b. 1970)
     Filters for viola and piano (1998); Boosey & Hawkes
     Stilled Voices for viola solo (1995); Boosey & Hawkes
 Zoltán Horusitzky (1903–1985)
     Sonata for viola and piano (1970); Editio Musica Budapest
 Toshio Hosokawa (b. 1955)
     Into the Depth of Time (時の深みへ; In die Tiefe der Zeit) for viola and accordion (1996); Schott Japan
     Lied II (リート II) for viola and piano (2008); Schott Japan
     Threnody: To the Victims of the Tōhoku Earthquake 3.11 (哀歌 −東日本大震災の犠牲者に捧げる−) for viola solo (2011); Schott Japan
     Two Arrangements for Viola (ヴィオラ編曲作品集) (2006); Schott Japan
        O Mensch, bewei'n dein' Sünde groß by Johann Sebastian Bach for viola and piano
        Lascia ch'io pianga by Georg Friedrich Händel for viola solo
     Voyage VI (旅 VI) for viola and string orchestra (2002); Schott Japan
 Stephen Hough (b. 1961)
     Sonata for viola and piano (1982); Josef Weinberger Music Publishing
 Alan Hovhaness (1911–2000)
     Campuan Sonata for viola and piano, Op. 371 (1982); Lim Chong Keat
     Chahagir (Torch Bearer) for viola solo, Op. 56a (1944); Rongwen Music; Broude Brothers Limited
     Sonata for solo viola, Op. 423 (1995); Broude Brothers Limited
     Talin, Concerto for viola and string orchestra, Op. 93 (1951–1952); Associated Music Publishers
 Egil Hovland (1924–2013)
     Concerto for viola and orchestra, Op. 153 (1996–1997); Norsk Musikforlag
 John Tasker Howard (1890–1964)
     Still Waters: Rêverie on a Psalm Tune for viola and piano (1946); Edition Musicus
 Herbert Howells (1892–1983)
     Elegy for viola, string quartet and string orchestra, Op. 17 (1917); Boosey & Hawkes
 Alexandru Hrisanide (1936–2018)
     Sonata (Music) for viola and piano (1965); Uniunea, Bucharest; Editions Gerig
 Ivan Hrušovský (1927–2001)
     Elégia for mezzo-soprano and viola (1985); Slovenský Hudobný Fond
     Lamento 94/95 for violin and viola (1995); Slovenský Hudobný Fond
 Ruo Huang (b. 1976)
     Being... for alto saxophone (or clarinet) and viola (1999)
     Wind Blows... for viola and piano (2007)
 Jenő Hubay (1858–1937)
     A képe előtt (Before Her Picture; Vor ihrem Bild; Devant son image) for viola and piano, Op. 38 No. 1 (1892); original for violin and piano; adaptation by B. Unkelstein
     Álmodozás (Rêverie) for viola and piano, Op. 49 No. 9 (1894); original for violin and piano; adaptation by Edwin H. Lemare
     Ballade for viola and harmonium, Op. 104 No. 1a (c.1904); reconstruction by Lajos Huszár
     Concerto in C major for viola and orchestra, Op. 20 (1884–1888); orchestration incomplete; movements II and III orchestrated by Lajos Huszár
     Májusi dal (Maggiolata; Chant de Mai) in B major for viola or cello and piano (or orchestra), Op. 15 No. 2 (1882)
     Mese (Fairy Tale; Un conte; Märchen) for violin or viola and piano, Op. 15 No. 1 (1882)
     Morceau de Concert in C major for viola and orchestra, Op. 20 (1884–1888, revised 1891); revision of movement I from the Viola Concerto
     Napfény (Ray of Sunshine; Rayon de Soleil) for viola and piano, Op. 87 No. 1 (1899); original for violin and piano; adaptation by the composer
 Klaus Huber (1924–2017)
     Das kleine Lied: Zweimal sieben Duette (The Little Song: Double Seven Duets) for alto voice and viola (1955)
     Fragmente aus Frühling (Fragments from Spring) for mezzo-soprano, viola and piano (1987); Ricordi
     ...Ohne Grenze und Rand... (...Without Boundary and Edge...) for viola and chamber orchestra (1977); Edition Schott
 Nicolaus A. Huber (b. 1939)
     Als eine Aussicht weit... for flute, viola and harp (1996); Breitkopf & Härtel
     EN for viola solo (2007); Breitkopf & Härtel
     Titty Twister for viola and accordion (2009); Breitkopf & Härtel
 Werner Hübschmann (1901–1969)
     Concerto for viola and orchestra (1928)
 Jiří Hudec (1923–1996)
     Uspávanka pro Martinku (Lullaby for Martinek) for viola and orchestra (1980); Český Hudební Fond
 Georges Hüe (1858–1948)
     Thème varié (Theme and Variations) in F minor for viola and piano (1907)
 Bertold Hummel (1925–2002)
     Albumblatt (Album Leaf) for viola and piano, Op. 87a (1987); N. Simrock Hamburg-London; Boosey & Hawkes; Schott Music
     Divertimento for viola and English horn, Op. 62b (1977); J. Schuberth & Co. Hamburg; Schott Music
     Elegie for viola and piano (1999); Schott Music
     Fantasia in G for viola solo, Op. 77d2 (1952); N. Simrock Hamburg-London; Boosey & Hawkes; Schott Music
     Fantasia Poetica for viola and hammered dulcimer, Op. 101b (1997); Vogt & Fritz
     Fantasie for viola and chamber orchestra, Op. 13f  (1956)
     Finale (Introduction and Allegro molto) for 4 violas, Op. 36b (1969, 1997); N. Simrock Hamburg-London; Boosey & Hawkes
     Little Suite for viola and piano, Op. 19c (1956); N. Simrock Hamburg-London; Boosey & Hawkes; Schott Music
     Romanze for viola and piano, Op. 69d (1975); J. Schuberth & Co. Hamburg; Schott Music
     Sonatina No. 1 in C major for viola and piano, Op. 35b (1969, 1971); N. Simrock Hamburg-London; Boosey & Hawkes; Schott Music
     Sonatina No. 2 for viola and piano, Op. 52b (1973); N. Simrock Hamburg-London; Boosey & Hawkes; Schott Music
     Sostenuto for viola and piano (or organ), Op. 11b (1955); N. Simrock Hamburg-London; Boosey & Hawkes; Schott Music
     Trio for clarinet, viola and piano, Op. 76a (1981); J. Schuberth & Co. Hamburg; Schott Music
     Trio Facile for violin, viola and piano, Op. 101a (1996); Schott Music
 Franz Hummel (1939–2022)
     Hatikva (Hope) for viola and orchestra (1992); Accent-Musikverlag
 Johann Nepomuk Hummel (1778–1837)
     Potpourri on Il mio tesoro in G minor (includes Fantasie in G minor) for viola, 2 clarinets and string orchestra, Op. 94 (1820)
     Sonata in E major for viola and piano, Op. 5 No. 3 (c.1798)
     Trio in G major for 2 violas and cello, S. 46 (1801)
 Xander Hunfeld (b. 1949)
     Triptiek (Triptych), Sonatina for viola and piano (2006); Donemus
 Jean Huré (1877–1930)
     Petite chanson (Little Song) in D major for cello (or viola) and piano (1901); Éditions Salabert
 William Yeates Hurlstone (1876–1906)
     4 Characteristic Pieces for viola and piano; original for clarinet and piano; edited by Lionel Tertis; Novello & Co.
 Ilja Hurník (1922–2013)
     Concerto for viola and string orchestra (1994); Český Hudební Fond
     Sonata for viola and piano, Op. 26 (1951); Státní Nakladatelství Krásné Literatury, Hudby a Umění; Český Hudební Fond
     Variace na Beethovenovo téma (Variations on a Theme of Beethoven) for viola and piano (1998); Ritornel, Ostrava; Český Hudební Fond
 Karel Husa (1921–2016)
     Poem for viola and piano or chamber orchestra (1959); Edition Schott
     Suite for viola and piano, Op. 5 (1945); Associated Music Publishers
 Henry Holden Huss (1862–1953)
     In Love, If Love Be Love (Vivian's Song) for mezzo-soprano, viola obbligato and piano
     Sonata "Sonata Rhapsodic" for viola and piano (1919); only Movement I complete; American Viola Society Publications
 Albert Huybrechts (1899–1938)
     Pastourelle for viola and piano (1934); original for viola da gamba or cello and piano; transcription by Arie Van de Moortel (1947); CeBeDeM
     Sonatine for flute and viola (1934); CeBeDeM
     Trio for flute, viola and piano (1926); CeBeDeM
 Miriam Hyde (1913–2005)
     Canzonetta for viola and piano (1988); Australian Music Centre
     Sonata in B minor for viola and piano (1937); Perth: Keys Press; Australian Music Centre
     Two Pieces for viola and piano (1946); Perth: Keys Press; Australian Music Centre
     Scherzino
     Passing Thoughts
 Lee Hyla (1952–2014)
     How Was Your Weekend for viola and cello (1994)
     Quarry for baritone and viola (2004); words by Paul Auster

References

External links
 Free scores featuring the viola at the International Music Score Library Project

 
Viola F-H